

521001–521100 

|-bgcolor=#d6d6d6
| 521001 ||  || — || January 29, 2009 || Mount Lemmon || Mount Lemmon Survey ||  || align=right | 2.9 km || 
|-id=002 bgcolor=#E9E9E9
| 521002 ||  || — || November 24, 2009 || Kitt Peak || Spacewatch ||  || align=right | 1.3 km || 
|-id=003 bgcolor=#d6d6d6
| 521003 ||  || — || February 12, 2004 || Kitt Peak || Spacewatch ||  || align=right | 3.0 km || 
|-id=004 bgcolor=#d6d6d6
| 521004 ||  || — || March 13, 2007 || Kitt Peak || Spacewatch ||  || align=right | 3.4 km || 
|-id=005 bgcolor=#d6d6d6
| 521005 ||  || — || March 11, 2005 || Mount Lemmon || Mount Lemmon Survey ||  || align=right | 2.1 km || 
|-id=006 bgcolor=#d6d6d6
| 521006 ||  || — || November 7, 2008 || Mount Lemmon || Mount Lemmon Survey ||  || align=right | 4.0 km || 
|-id=007 bgcolor=#d6d6d6
| 521007 ||  || — || September 10, 2007 || Kitt Peak || Spacewatch ||  || align=right | 2.3 km || 
|-id=008 bgcolor=#fefefe
| 521008 ||  || — || December 26, 2006 || Kitt Peak || Spacewatch ||  || align=right data-sort-value="0.85" | 850 m || 
|-id=009 bgcolor=#d6d6d6
| 521009 ||  || — || February 19, 2009 || Kitt Peak || Spacewatch ||  || align=right | 3.4 km || 
|-id=010 bgcolor=#E9E9E9
| 521010 ||  || — || February 10, 2011 || Mount Lemmon || Mount Lemmon Survey ||  || align=right | 1.3 km || 
|-id=011 bgcolor=#E9E9E9
| 521011 ||  || — || January 22, 2015 || Haleakala || Pan-STARRS ||  || align=right | 1.9 km || 
|-id=012 bgcolor=#E9E9E9
| 521012 ||  || — || January 16, 2015 || Haleakala || Pan-STARRS ||  || align=right | 1.1 km || 
|-id=013 bgcolor=#d6d6d6
| 521013 ||  || — || November 9, 2007 || Catalina || CSS ||  || align=right | 3.5 km || 
|-id=014 bgcolor=#d6d6d6
| 521014 ||  || — || August 21, 2012 || Haleakala || Pan-STARRS ||  || align=right | 3.3 km || 
|-id=015 bgcolor=#d6d6d6
| 521015 ||  || — || February 10, 2015 || Kitt Peak || Spacewatch ||  || align=right | 2.4 km || 
|-id=016 bgcolor=#E9E9E9
| 521016 ||  || — || October 28, 2013 || Mount Lemmon || Mount Lemmon Survey ||  || align=right | 1.0 km || 
|-id=017 bgcolor=#d6d6d6
| 521017 ||  || — || February 18, 2010 || Mount Lemmon || Mount Lemmon Survey ||  || align=right | 2.6 km || 
|-id=018 bgcolor=#E9E9E9
| 521018 ||  || — || January 31, 2006 || Mount Lemmon || Mount Lemmon Survey ||  || align=right | 1.3 km || 
|-id=019 bgcolor=#d6d6d6
| 521019 ||  || — || January 21, 2015 || Haleakala || Pan-STARRS ||  || align=right | 2.2 km || 
|-id=020 bgcolor=#E9E9E9
| 521020 ||  || — || September 4, 2008 || Kitt Peak || Spacewatch ||  || align=right | 2.2 km || 
|-id=021 bgcolor=#d6d6d6
| 521021 ||  || — || September 21, 2012 || Mount Lemmon || Mount Lemmon Survey ||  || align=right | 2.8 km || 
|-id=022 bgcolor=#d6d6d6
| 521022 ||  || — || February 2, 2009 || Kitt Peak || Spacewatch ||  || align=right | 2.8 km || 
|-id=023 bgcolor=#E9E9E9
| 521023 ||  || — || August 24, 2007 || Kitt Peak || Spacewatch ||  || align=right | 2.5 km || 
|-id=024 bgcolor=#E9E9E9
| 521024 ||  || — || November 26, 2009 || Mount Lemmon || Mount Lemmon Survey ||  || align=right | 2.1 km || 
|-id=025 bgcolor=#E9E9E9
| 521025 ||  || — || November 10, 2013 || Mount Lemmon || Mount Lemmon Survey ||  || align=right | 1.5 km || 
|-id=026 bgcolor=#E9E9E9
| 521026 ||  || — || January 27, 2015 || Haleakala || Pan-STARRS ||  || align=right | 1.00 km || 
|-id=027 bgcolor=#d6d6d6
| 521027 ||  || — || January 25, 2015 || Haleakala || Pan-STARRS ||  || align=right | 2.4 km || 
|-id=028 bgcolor=#E9E9E9
| 521028 ||  || — || December 16, 2009 || Mount Lemmon || Mount Lemmon Survey ||  || align=right | 2.1 km || 
|-id=029 bgcolor=#E9E9E9
| 521029 ||  || — || April 25, 2007 || Kitt Peak || Spacewatch ||  || align=right | 1.6 km || 
|-id=030 bgcolor=#E9E9E9
| 521030 ||  || — || September 10, 2008 || Kitt Peak || Spacewatch ||  || align=right | 2.4 km || 
|-id=031 bgcolor=#d6d6d6
| 521031 ||  || — || June 15, 2005 || Kitt Peak || Spacewatch ||  || align=right | 3.0 km || 
|-id=032 bgcolor=#E9E9E9
| 521032 ||  || — || January 23, 2015 || Haleakala || Pan-STARRS ||  || align=right data-sort-value="0.89" | 890 m || 
|-id=033 bgcolor=#d6d6d6
| 521033 ||  || — || January 16, 2009 || Kitt Peak || Spacewatch ||  || align=right | 2.8 km || 
|-id=034 bgcolor=#d6d6d6
| 521034 ||  || — || September 14, 2012 || Catalina || CSS ||  || align=right | 3.4 km || 
|-id=035 bgcolor=#fefefe
| 521035 ||  || — || February 2, 2008 || Kitt Peak || Spacewatch ||  || align=right data-sort-value="0.85" | 850 m || 
|-id=036 bgcolor=#fefefe
| 521036 ||  || — || January 20, 2015 || Haleakala || Pan-STARRS || H || align=right data-sort-value="0.52" | 520 m || 
|-id=037 bgcolor=#fefefe
| 521037 ||  || — || June 2, 2013 || Kitt Peak || Spacewatch || H || align=right data-sort-value="0.65" | 650 m || 
|-id=038 bgcolor=#d6d6d6
| 521038 ||  || — || August 21, 2006 || Kitt Peak || Spacewatch ||  || align=right | 2.8 km || 
|-id=039 bgcolor=#d6d6d6
| 521039 ||  || — || August 25, 2012 || Kitt Peak || Spacewatch ||  || align=right | 2.2 km || 
|-id=040 bgcolor=#d6d6d6
| 521040 ||  || — || February 10, 2010 || Kitt Peak || Spacewatch ||  || align=right | 2.8 km || 
|-id=041 bgcolor=#fefefe
| 521041 ||  || — || April 13, 2008 || Mount Lemmon || Mount Lemmon Survey ||  || align=right data-sort-value="0.62" | 620 m || 
|-id=042 bgcolor=#E9E9E9
| 521042 ||  || — || August 3, 2004 || Siding Spring || SSS ||  || align=right | 1.0 km || 
|-id=043 bgcolor=#d6d6d6
| 521043 ||  || — || February 15, 2010 || Kitt Peak || Spacewatch ||  || align=right | 1.8 km || 
|-id=044 bgcolor=#E9E9E9
| 521044 ||  || — || February 20, 2006 || Kitt Peak || Spacewatch ||  || align=right | 1.5 km || 
|-id=045 bgcolor=#d6d6d6
| 521045 ||  || — || November 19, 2008 || Kitt Peak || Spacewatch ||  || align=right | 2.0 km || 
|-id=046 bgcolor=#fefefe
| 521046 ||  || — || October 3, 2013 || Haleakala || Pan-STARRS ||  || align=right data-sort-value="0.71" | 710 m || 
|-id=047 bgcolor=#E9E9E9
| 521047 ||  || — || March 12, 2007 || Kitt Peak || Spacewatch ||  || align=right data-sort-value="0.77" | 770 m || 
|-id=048 bgcolor=#d6d6d6
| 521048 ||  || — || January 23, 2015 || Haleakala || Pan-STARRS ||  || align=right | 3.0 km || 
|-id=049 bgcolor=#d6d6d6
| 521049 ||  || — || April 20, 2010 || Mount Lemmon || Mount Lemmon Survey ||  || align=right | 3.0 km || 
|-id=050 bgcolor=#E9E9E9
| 521050 ||  || — || August 7, 2008 || Kitt Peak || Spacewatch ||  || align=right | 1.2 km || 
|-id=051 bgcolor=#d6d6d6
| 521051 ||  || — || January 29, 2015 || Haleakala || Pan-STARRS ||  || align=right | 2.6 km || 
|-id=052 bgcolor=#E9E9E9
| 521052 ||  || — || August 13, 2012 || Haleakala || Pan-STARRS ||  || align=right | 1.3 km || 
|-id=053 bgcolor=#E9E9E9
| 521053 ||  || — || January 23, 2006 || Kitt Peak || Spacewatch ||  || align=right | 1.5 km || 
|-id=054 bgcolor=#E9E9E9
| 521054 ||  || — || October 24, 2009 || Kitt Peak || Spacewatch ||  || align=right data-sort-value="0.76" | 760 m || 
|-id=055 bgcolor=#d6d6d6
| 521055 ||  || — || February 16, 2015 || Haleakala || Pan-STARRS ||  || align=right | 2.1 km || 
|-id=056 bgcolor=#E9E9E9
| 521056 ||  || — || November 2, 2013 || Mount Lemmon || Mount Lemmon Survey ||  || align=right | 1.2 km || 
|-id=057 bgcolor=#E9E9E9
| 521057 ||  || — || January 7, 2010 || Kitt Peak || Spacewatch ||  || align=right | 1.7 km || 
|-id=058 bgcolor=#E9E9E9
| 521058 ||  || — || March 16, 2007 || Kitt Peak || Spacewatch ||  || align=right data-sort-value="0.77" | 770 m || 
|-id=059 bgcolor=#fefefe
| 521059 ||  || — || January 10, 2008 || Kitt Peak || Spacewatch ||  || align=right data-sort-value="0.55" | 550 m || 
|-id=060 bgcolor=#d6d6d6
| 521060 ||  || — || October 10, 2007 || Kitt Peak || Spacewatch ||  || align=right | 2.0 km || 
|-id=061 bgcolor=#E9E9E9
| 521061 ||  || — || May 7, 2006 || Mount Lemmon || Mount Lemmon Survey ||  || align=right | 1.9 km || 
|-id=062 bgcolor=#d6d6d6
| 521062 ||  || — || March 18, 2010 || Kitt Peak || Spacewatch ||  || align=right | 2.6 km || 
|-id=063 bgcolor=#E9E9E9
| 521063 ||  || — || January 6, 2010 || Kitt Peak || Spacewatch ||  || align=right | 1.5 km || 
|-id=064 bgcolor=#d6d6d6
| 521064 ||  || — || February 14, 2005 || Kitt Peak || Spacewatch ||  || align=right | 2.4 km || 
|-id=065 bgcolor=#E9E9E9
| 521065 ||  || — || August 21, 2008 || Kitt Peak || Spacewatch ||  || align=right data-sort-value="0.82" | 820 m || 
|-id=066 bgcolor=#fefefe
| 521066 ||  || — || January 2, 2011 || Mount Lemmon || Mount Lemmon Survey ||  || align=right data-sort-value="0.57" | 570 m || 
|-id=067 bgcolor=#E9E9E9
| 521067 ||  || — || September 23, 2008 || Kitt Peak || Spacewatch ||  || align=right | 1.7 km || 
|-id=068 bgcolor=#d6d6d6
| 521068 ||  || — || October 9, 2007 || Kitt Peak || Spacewatch ||  || align=right | 2.5 km || 
|-id=069 bgcolor=#fefefe
| 521069 ||  || — || May 3, 2008 || Kitt Peak || Spacewatch ||  || align=right data-sort-value="0.72" | 720 m || 
|-id=070 bgcolor=#E9E9E9
| 521070 ||  || — || January 26, 2006 || Mount Lemmon || Mount Lemmon Survey ||  || align=right | 1.3 km || 
|-id=071 bgcolor=#fefefe
| 521071 ||  || — || September 13, 2005 || Kitt Peak || Spacewatch ||  || align=right data-sort-value="0.77" | 770 m || 
|-id=072 bgcolor=#d6d6d6
| 521072 ||  || — || January 1, 2014 || Haleakala || Pan-STARRS ||  || align=right | 3.5 km || 
|-id=073 bgcolor=#E9E9E9
| 521073 ||  || — || January 28, 2015 || Haleakala || Pan-STARRS ||  || align=right | 1.4 km || 
|-id=074 bgcolor=#E9E9E9
| 521074 ||  || — || February 16, 2015 || Haleakala || Pan-STARRS ||  || align=right | 1.5 km || 
|-id=075 bgcolor=#d6d6d6
| 521075 ||  || — || March 24, 2010 || WISE || WISE ||  || align=right | 2.6 km || 
|-id=076 bgcolor=#fefefe
| 521076 ||  || — || December 23, 1998 || Kitt Peak || Spacewatch ||  || align=right data-sort-value="0.98" | 980 m || 
|-id=077 bgcolor=#E9E9E9
| 521077 ||  || — || April 24, 2011 || Kitt Peak || Spacewatch ||  || align=right | 2.4 km || 
|-id=078 bgcolor=#E9E9E9
| 521078 ||  || — || November 7, 2008 || Mount Lemmon || Mount Lemmon Survey ||  || align=right | 2.3 km || 
|-id=079 bgcolor=#E9E9E9
| 521079 ||  || — || October 14, 2013 || Kitt Peak || Spacewatch ||  || align=right | 1.9 km || 
|-id=080 bgcolor=#d6d6d6
| 521080 ||  || — || January 29, 2015 || Haleakala || Pan-STARRS ||  || align=right | 2.9 km || 
|-id=081 bgcolor=#E9E9E9
| 521081 ||  || — || January 19, 2015 || Mount Lemmon || Mount Lemmon Survey ||  || align=right | 1.6 km || 
|-id=082 bgcolor=#fefefe
| 521082 ||  || — || January 24, 2015 || Haleakala || Pan-STARRS ||  || align=right data-sort-value="0.69" | 690 m || 
|-id=083 bgcolor=#E9E9E9
| 521083 ||  || — || October 15, 2013 || Mount Lemmon || Mount Lemmon Survey ||  || align=right | 1.9 km || 
|-id=084 bgcolor=#E9E9E9
| 521084 ||  || — || March 14, 2011 || Kitt Peak || Spacewatch ||  || align=right | 1.2 km || 
|-id=085 bgcolor=#d6d6d6
| 521085 ||  || — || October 20, 2012 || Haleakala || Pan-STARRS ||  || align=right | 2.3 km || 
|-id=086 bgcolor=#d6d6d6
| 521086 ||  || — || February 18, 2015 || Haleakala || Pan-STARRS ||  || align=right | 2.2 km || 
|-id=087 bgcolor=#E9E9E9
| 521087 ||  || — || October 23, 2004 || Kitt Peak || Spacewatch ||  || align=right | 1.7 km || 
|-id=088 bgcolor=#d6d6d6
| 521088 ||  || — || March 19, 2010 || Mount Lemmon || Mount Lemmon Survey ||  || align=right | 1.8 km || 
|-id=089 bgcolor=#d6d6d6
| 521089 ||  || — || September 22, 1995 || Kitt Peak || Spacewatch ||  || align=right | 3.5 km || 
|-id=090 bgcolor=#E9E9E9
| 521090 ||  || — || January 21, 2015 || Haleakala || Pan-STARRS ||  || align=right data-sort-value="0.90" | 900 m || 
|-id=091 bgcolor=#E9E9E9
| 521091 ||  || — || April 6, 2011 || Mount Lemmon || Mount Lemmon Survey ||  || align=right | 1.3 km || 
|-id=092 bgcolor=#d6d6d6
| 521092 ||  || — || January 31, 2009 || Mount Lemmon || Mount Lemmon Survey ||  || align=right | 3.2 km || 
|-id=093 bgcolor=#E9E9E9
| 521093 ||  || — || October 28, 2005 || Kitt Peak || Spacewatch ||  || align=right data-sort-value="0.64" | 640 m || 
|-id=094 bgcolor=#d6d6d6
| 521094 ||  || — || January 31, 2009 || Kitt Peak || Spacewatch ||  || align=right | 2.0 km || 
|-id=095 bgcolor=#E9E9E9
| 521095 ||  || — || May 31, 2011 || Mount Lemmon || Mount Lemmon Survey ||  || align=right | 1.8 km || 
|-id=096 bgcolor=#E9E9E9
| 521096 ||  || — || April 19, 2007 || Mount Lemmon || Mount Lemmon Survey ||  || align=right | 1.2 km || 
|-id=097 bgcolor=#E9E9E9
| 521097 ||  || — || January 16, 2015 || Haleakala || Pan-STARRS ||  || align=right | 1.2 km || 
|-id=098 bgcolor=#d6d6d6
| 521098 ||  || — || November 13, 2007 || Kitt Peak || Spacewatch ||  || align=right | 3.2 km || 
|-id=099 bgcolor=#d6d6d6
| 521099 ||  || — || February 20, 2015 || Haleakala || Pan-STARRS ||  || align=right | 3.3 km || 
|-id=100 bgcolor=#d6d6d6
| 521100 ||  || — || November 24, 2008 || Mount Lemmon || Mount Lemmon Survey ||  || align=right | 3.0 km || 
|}

521101–521200 

|-bgcolor=#d6d6d6
| 521101 ||  || — || November 29, 2014 || Mount Lemmon || Mount Lemmon Survey ||  || align=right | 3.6 km || 
|-id=102 bgcolor=#d6d6d6
| 521102 ||  || — || October 17, 2012 || Haleakala || Pan-STARRS ||  || align=right | 2.5 km || 
|-id=103 bgcolor=#fefefe
| 521103 ||  || — || February 23, 2015 || Haleakala || Pan-STARRS ||  || align=right data-sort-value="0.71" | 710 m || 
|-id=104 bgcolor=#d6d6d6
| 521104 ||  || — || June 10, 2011 || Mount Lemmon || Mount Lemmon Survey ||  || align=right | 3.4 km || 
|-id=105 bgcolor=#E9E9E9
| 521105 ||  || — || October 25, 2008 || Mount Lemmon || Mount Lemmon Survey ||  || align=right | 1.3 km || 
|-id=106 bgcolor=#d6d6d6
| 521106 ||  || — || February 6, 2014 || Mount Lemmon || Mount Lemmon Survey ||  || align=right | 2.3 km || 
|-id=107 bgcolor=#d6d6d6
| 521107 ||  || — || November 7, 2012 || Haleakala || Pan-STARRS ||  || align=right | 2.5 km || 
|-id=108 bgcolor=#fefefe
| 521108 ||  || — || March 13, 2011 || Kitt Peak || Spacewatch ||  || align=right data-sort-value="0.85" | 850 m || 
|-id=109 bgcolor=#d6d6d6
| 521109 ||  || — || January 10, 2014 || Mount Lemmon || Mount Lemmon Survey ||  || align=right | 2.3 km || 
|-id=110 bgcolor=#E9E9E9
| 521110 ||  || — || August 26, 2012 || Haleakala || Pan-STARRS ||  || align=right | 1.1 km || 
|-id=111 bgcolor=#d6d6d6
| 521111 ||  || — || September 9, 2007 || Kitt Peak || Spacewatch ||  || align=right | 3.3 km || 
|-id=112 bgcolor=#d6d6d6
| 521112 ||  || — || April 10, 2010 || Kitt Peak || Spacewatch ||  || align=right | 3.2 km || 
|-id=113 bgcolor=#d6d6d6
| 521113 ||  || — || January 5, 2014 || Haleakala || Pan-STARRS ||  || align=right | 2.4 km || 
|-id=114 bgcolor=#fefefe
| 521114 ||  || — || March 15, 2011 || Haleakala || Pan-STARRS ||  || align=right data-sort-value="0.75" | 750 m || 
|-id=115 bgcolor=#E9E9E9
| 521115 ||  || — || November 21, 2008 || Mount Lemmon || Mount Lemmon Survey ||  || align=right | 1.8 km || 
|-id=116 bgcolor=#E9E9E9
| 521116 ||  || — || September 5, 2008 || Kitt Peak || Spacewatch ||  || align=right | 1.7 km || 
|-id=117 bgcolor=#fefefe
| 521117 ||  || — || March 10, 2008 || Kitt Peak || Spacewatch ||  || align=right data-sort-value="0.67" | 670 m || 
|-id=118 bgcolor=#E9E9E9
| 521118 ||  || — || October 5, 2004 || Kitt Peak || Spacewatch ||  || align=right | 1.3 km || 
|-id=119 bgcolor=#fefefe
| 521119 ||  || — || November 10, 2009 || Mount Lemmon || Mount Lemmon Survey ||  || align=right data-sort-value="0.78" | 780 m || 
|-id=120 bgcolor=#E9E9E9
| 521120 ||  || — || April 9, 2003 || Kitt Peak || Spacewatch ||  || align=right data-sort-value="0.76" | 760 m || 
|-id=121 bgcolor=#E9E9E9
| 521121 ||  || — || October 27, 2009 || Mount Lemmon || Mount Lemmon Survey ||  || align=right | 1.1 km || 
|-id=122 bgcolor=#fefefe
| 521122 ||  || — || March 31, 2008 || Kitt Peak || Spacewatch ||  || align=right data-sort-value="0.72" | 720 m || 
|-id=123 bgcolor=#E9E9E9
| 521123 ||  || — || January 22, 2015 || Haleakala || Pan-STARRS ||  || align=right | 1.6 km || 
|-id=124 bgcolor=#E9E9E9
| 521124 ||  || — || August 26, 2012 || Haleakala || Pan-STARRS ||  || align=right | 1.5 km || 
|-id=125 bgcolor=#d6d6d6
| 521125 ||  || — || October 18, 2012 || Haleakala || Pan-STARRS ||  || align=right | 2.5 km || 
|-id=126 bgcolor=#d6d6d6
| 521126 ||  || — || September 19, 2006 || Kitt Peak || Spacewatch ||  || align=right | 2.3 km || 
|-id=127 bgcolor=#E9E9E9
| 521127 ||  || — || September 4, 2008 || Kitt Peak || Spacewatch ||  || align=right | 1.3 km || 
|-id=128 bgcolor=#d6d6d6
| 521128 ||  || — || April 17, 2009 || Catalina || CSS ||  || align=right | 2.9 km || 
|-id=129 bgcolor=#d6d6d6
| 521129 ||  || — || October 21, 2012 || Mount Lemmon || Mount Lemmon Survey ||  || align=right | 3.3 km || 
|-id=130 bgcolor=#d6d6d6
| 521130 ||  || — || February 24, 2014 || Haleakala || Pan-STARRS ||  || align=right | 2.9 km || 
|-id=131 bgcolor=#fefefe
| 521131 ||  || — || February 2, 2012 || Kitt Peak || Spacewatch || H || align=right data-sort-value="0.59" | 590 m || 
|-id=132 bgcolor=#fefefe
| 521132 ||  || — || December 1, 2014 || Haleakala || Pan-STARRS || H || align=right data-sort-value="0.71" | 710 m || 
|-id=133 bgcolor=#d6d6d6
| 521133 ||  || — || January 20, 2009 || Kitt Peak || Spacewatch ||  || align=right | 2.5 km || 
|-id=134 bgcolor=#d6d6d6
| 521134 ||  || — || January 21, 2015 || Haleakala || Pan-STARRS ||  || align=right | 2.3 km || 
|-id=135 bgcolor=#d6d6d6
| 521135 ||  || — || January 24, 2014 || Haleakala || Pan-STARRS ||  || align=right | 3.3 km || 
|-id=136 bgcolor=#fefefe
| 521136 ||  || — || January 10, 2007 || Mount Lemmon || Mount Lemmon Survey || H || align=right data-sort-value="0.56" | 560 m || 
|-id=137 bgcolor=#d6d6d6
| 521137 ||  || — || March 17, 2015 || Haleakala || Pan-STARRS ||  || align=right | 2.8 km || 
|-id=138 bgcolor=#fefefe
| 521138 ||  || — || January 2, 2009 || Mount Lemmon || Mount Lemmon Survey || H || align=right data-sort-value="0.74" | 740 m || 
|-id=139 bgcolor=#fefefe
| 521139 ||  || — || June 30, 2013 || Haleakala || Pan-STARRS || H || align=right data-sort-value="0.75" | 750 m || 
|-id=140 bgcolor=#fefefe
| 521140 ||  || — || October 7, 2008 || Catalina || CSS || H || align=right data-sort-value="0.75" | 750 m || 
|-id=141 bgcolor=#fefefe
| 521141 ||  || — || September 29, 2003 || Kitt Peak || Spacewatch ||  || align=right data-sort-value="0.79" | 790 m || 
|-id=142 bgcolor=#d6d6d6
| 521142 ||  || — || October 9, 2012 || Mount Lemmon || Mount Lemmon Survey ||  || align=right | 2.3 km || 
|-id=143 bgcolor=#E9E9E9
| 521143 ||  || — || May 24, 2011 || Haleakala || Pan-STARRS ||  || align=right | 2.4 km || 
|-id=144 bgcolor=#d6d6d6
| 521144 ||  || — || October 1, 2005 || Mount Lemmon || Mount Lemmon Survey || Tj (2.99) || align=right | 2.9 km || 
|-id=145 bgcolor=#fefefe
| 521145 ||  || — || March 12, 2008 || Kitt Peak || Spacewatch ||  || align=right data-sort-value="0.62" | 620 m || 
|-id=146 bgcolor=#d6d6d6
| 521146 ||  || — || August 29, 2006 || Kitt Peak || Spacewatch ||  || align=right | 2.8 km || 
|-id=147 bgcolor=#E9E9E9
| 521147 ||  || — || April 13, 2011 || Kitt Peak || Spacewatch ||  || align=right | 1.3 km || 
|-id=148 bgcolor=#E9E9E9
| 521148 ||  || — || February 18, 2010 || Mount Lemmon || Mount Lemmon Survey ||  || align=right | 1.7 km || 
|-id=149 bgcolor=#d6d6d6
| 521149 ||  || — || March 17, 2015 || Haleakala || Pan-STARRS ||  || align=right | 2.1 km || 
|-id=150 bgcolor=#E9E9E9
| 521150 ||  || — || November 29, 2013 || Kitt Peak || Spacewatch ||  || align=right data-sort-value="0.79" | 790 m || 
|-id=151 bgcolor=#d6d6d6
| 521151 ||  || — || November 12, 2012 || Mount Lemmon || Mount Lemmon Survey ||  || align=right | 2.7 km || 
|-id=152 bgcolor=#d6d6d6
| 521152 ||  || — || October 23, 2012 || Kitt Peak || Spacewatch ||  || align=right | 3.2 km || 
|-id=153 bgcolor=#E9E9E9
| 521153 ||  || — || January 4, 2010 || Kitt Peak || Spacewatch ||  || align=right | 3.0 km || 
|-id=154 bgcolor=#E9E9E9
| 521154 ||  || — || February 18, 2010 || Kitt Peak || Spacewatch ||  || align=right | 1.7 km || 
|-id=155 bgcolor=#d6d6d6
| 521155 ||  || — || May 13, 2005 || Kitt Peak || Spacewatch ||  || align=right | 2.3 km || 
|-id=156 bgcolor=#E9E9E9
| 521156 ||  || — || October 8, 2008 || Kitt Peak || Spacewatch ||  || align=right | 1.9 km || 
|-id=157 bgcolor=#d6d6d6
| 521157 ||  || — || August 28, 2006 || Kitt Peak || Spacewatch ||  || align=right | 2.2 km || 
|-id=158 bgcolor=#d6d6d6
| 521158 ||  || — || December 30, 2013 || Mount Lemmon || Mount Lemmon Survey ||  || align=right | 2.8 km || 
|-id=159 bgcolor=#d6d6d6
| 521159 ||  || — || November 14, 2012 || Mount Lemmon || Mount Lemmon Survey ||  || align=right | 2.5 km || 
|-id=160 bgcolor=#d6d6d6
| 521160 ||  || — || February 24, 2009 || Kitt Peak || Spacewatch ||  || align=right | 2.6 km || 
|-id=161 bgcolor=#d6d6d6
| 521161 ||  || — || August 27, 2011 || Haleakala || Pan-STARRS ||  || align=right | 2.4 km || 
|-id=162 bgcolor=#d6d6d6
| 521162 ||  || — || October 13, 2007 || Mount Lemmon || Mount Lemmon Survey ||  || align=right | 2.7 km || 
|-id=163 bgcolor=#fefefe
| 521163 ||  || — || October 12, 2005 || Kitt Peak || Spacewatch ||  || align=right data-sort-value="0.78" | 780 m || 
|-id=164 bgcolor=#E9E9E9
| 521164 ||  || — || October 23, 2008 || Kitt Peak || Spacewatch ||  || align=right | 1.5 km || 
|-id=165 bgcolor=#d6d6d6
| 521165 ||  || — || March 21, 2015 || Haleakala || Pan-STARRS ||  || align=right | 2.5 km || 
|-id=166 bgcolor=#d6d6d6
| 521166 ||  || — || November 3, 2007 || Kitt Peak || Spacewatch ||  || align=right | 3.2 km || 
|-id=167 bgcolor=#E9E9E9
| 521167 ||  || — || March 21, 2015 || Haleakala || Pan-STARRS ||  || align=right | 2.3 km || 
|-id=168 bgcolor=#E9E9E9
| 521168 ||  || — || October 18, 2012 || Haleakala || Pan-STARRS ||  || align=right | 1.3 km || 
|-id=169 bgcolor=#d6d6d6
| 521169 ||  || — || November 30, 2008 || Kitt Peak || Spacewatch ||  || align=right | 2.0 km || 
|-id=170 bgcolor=#d6d6d6
| 521170 ||  || — || January 3, 2009 || Mount Lemmon || Mount Lemmon Survey ||  || align=right | 2.7 km || 
|-id=171 bgcolor=#fefefe
| 521171 ||  || — || September 17, 2013 || Mount Lemmon || Mount Lemmon Survey ||  || align=right data-sort-value="0.73" | 730 m || 
|-id=172 bgcolor=#E9E9E9
| 521172 ||  || — || March 22, 2015 || Haleakala || Pan-STARRS ||  || align=right | 1.3 km || 
|-id=173 bgcolor=#E9E9E9
| 521173 ||  || — || March 22, 2015 || Haleakala || Pan-STARRS ||  || align=right | 1.4 km || 
|-id=174 bgcolor=#E9E9E9
| 521174 ||  || — || December 7, 2013 || Haleakala || Pan-STARRS ||  || align=right | 1.5 km || 
|-id=175 bgcolor=#fefefe
| 521175 ||  || — || March 22, 2015 || Haleakala || Pan-STARRS ||  || align=right data-sort-value="0.80" | 800 m || 
|-id=176 bgcolor=#d6d6d6
| 521176 ||  || — || February 2, 2009 || Kitt Peak || Spacewatch ||  || align=right | 2.2 km || 
|-id=177 bgcolor=#E9E9E9
| 521177 ||  || — || January 31, 2006 || Mount Lemmon || Mount Lemmon Survey ||  || align=right | 1.1 km || 
|-id=178 bgcolor=#E9E9E9
| 521178 ||  || — || January 19, 2015 || Haleakala || Pan-STARRS ||  || align=right | 1.0 km || 
|-id=179 bgcolor=#d6d6d6
| 521179 ||  || — || September 17, 2012 || Kitt Peak || Spacewatch ||  || align=right | 3.0 km || 
|-id=180 bgcolor=#fefefe
| 521180 ||  || — || November 21, 2006 || Mount Lemmon || Mount Lemmon Survey ||  || align=right data-sort-value="0.89" | 890 m || 
|-id=181 bgcolor=#d6d6d6
| 521181 ||  || — || October 20, 2012 || Haleakala || Pan-STARRS ||  || align=right | 2.4 km || 
|-id=182 bgcolor=#d6d6d6
| 521182 ||  || — || September 25, 2011 || Haleakala || Pan-STARRS ||  || align=right | 2.8 km || 
|-id=183 bgcolor=#E9E9E9
| 521183 ||  || — || December 18, 2009 || Kitt Peak || Spacewatch ||  || align=right | 1.6 km || 
|-id=184 bgcolor=#E9E9E9
| 521184 ||  || — || March 28, 2015 || Haleakala || Pan-STARRS ||  || align=right | 1.1 km || 
|-id=185 bgcolor=#d6d6d6
| 521185 ||  || — || January 31, 2009 || Kitt Peak || Spacewatch ||  || align=right | 2.6 km || 
|-id=186 bgcolor=#E9E9E9
| 521186 ||  || — || November 29, 2013 || Haleakala || Pan-STARRS ||  || align=right data-sort-value="0.93" | 930 m || 
|-id=187 bgcolor=#d6d6d6
| 521187 ||  || — || January 9, 2014 || Mount Lemmon || Mount Lemmon Survey ||  || align=right | 2.7 km || 
|-id=188 bgcolor=#d6d6d6
| 521188 ||  || — || March 28, 2015 || Haleakala || Pan-STARRS ||  || align=right | 2.1 km || 
|-id=189 bgcolor=#d6d6d6
| 521189 ||  || — || December 4, 2007 || Kitt Peak || Spacewatch ||  || align=right | 3.4 km || 
|-id=190 bgcolor=#d6d6d6
| 521190 ||  || — || January 23, 2014 || Mount Lemmon || Mount Lemmon Survey ||  || align=right | 2.7 km || 
|-id=191 bgcolor=#E9E9E9
| 521191 ||  || — || January 9, 2014 || Mount Lemmon || Mount Lemmon Survey ||  || align=right | 1.9 km || 
|-id=192 bgcolor=#d6d6d6
| 521192 ||  || — || September 26, 2006 || Kitt Peak || Spacewatch ||  || align=right | 3.2 km || 
|-id=193 bgcolor=#E9E9E9
| 521193 ||  || — || December 31, 2013 || Haleakala || Pan-STARRS ||  || align=right | 2.1 km || 
|-id=194 bgcolor=#E9E9E9
| 521194 ||  || — || November 9, 2013 || Catalina || CSS ||  || align=right | 2.0 km || 
|-id=195 bgcolor=#d6d6d6
| 521195 ||  || — || October 9, 2012 || Haleakala || Pan-STARRS ||  || align=right | 1.9 km || 
|-id=196 bgcolor=#d6d6d6
| 521196 ||  || — || September 24, 2007 || Kitt Peak || Spacewatch ||  || align=right | 3.4 km || 
|-id=197 bgcolor=#fefefe
| 521197 ||  || — || April 14, 2008 || Mount Lemmon || Mount Lemmon Survey ||  || align=right data-sort-value="0.73" | 730 m || 
|-id=198 bgcolor=#fefefe
| 521198 ||  || — || November 28, 2013 || Mount Lemmon || Mount Lemmon Survey ||  || align=right data-sort-value="0.71" | 710 m || 
|-id=199 bgcolor=#d6d6d6
| 521199 ||  || — || December 31, 2008 || Kitt Peak || Spacewatch ||  || align=right | 3.0 km || 
|-id=200 bgcolor=#d6d6d6
| 521200 ||  || — || February 28, 2014 || Haleakala || Pan-STARRS ||  || align=right | 2.3 km || 
|}

521201–521300 

|-bgcolor=#d6d6d6
| 521201 ||  || — || October 26, 2011 || Haleakala || Pan-STARRS ||  || align=right | 3.1 km || 
|-id=202 bgcolor=#E9E9E9
| 521202 ||  || — || March 29, 2015 || Haleakala || Pan-STARRS ||  || align=right | 1.3 km || 
|-id=203 bgcolor=#fefefe
| 521203 ||  || — || March 15, 2007 || Mount Lemmon || Mount Lemmon Survey ||  || align=right data-sort-value="0.97" | 970 m || 
|-id=204 bgcolor=#d6d6d6
| 521204 ||  || — || March 30, 2015 || Haleakala || Pan-STARRS ||  || align=right | 2.6 km || 
|-id=205 bgcolor=#d6d6d6
| 521205 ||  || — || March 17, 2009 || Kitt Peak || Spacewatch ||  || align=right | 2.1 km || 
|-id=206 bgcolor=#E9E9E9
| 521206 ||  || — || March 18, 2010 || Kitt Peak || Spacewatch ||  || align=right | 2.0 km || 
|-id=207 bgcolor=#E9E9E9
| 521207 ||  || — || April 21, 2006 || Kitt Peak || Spacewatch ||  || align=right | 1.6 km || 
|-id=208 bgcolor=#d6d6d6
| 521208 ||  || — || September 17, 2006 || Kitt Peak || Spacewatch ||  || align=right | 2.1 km || 
|-id=209 bgcolor=#d6d6d6
| 521209 ||  || — || March 30, 2015 || Haleakala || Pan-STARRS ||  || align=right | 2.1 km || 
|-id=210 bgcolor=#d6d6d6
| 521210 ||  || — || October 18, 2007 || Kitt Peak || Spacewatch ||  || align=right | 2.2 km || 
|-id=211 bgcolor=#d6d6d6
| 521211 ||  || — || March 2, 2009 || Kitt Peak || Spacewatch ||  || align=right | 2.5 km || 
|-id=212 bgcolor=#d6d6d6
| 521212 ||  || — || March 30, 2015 || Haleakala || Pan-STARRS ||  || align=right | 2.3 km || 
|-id=213 bgcolor=#d6d6d6
| 521213 ||  || — || September 27, 2006 || Catalina || CSS ||  || align=right | 3.6 km || 
|-id=214 bgcolor=#E9E9E9
| 521214 ||  || — || February 11, 2011 || Catalina || CSS ||  || align=right | 1.9 km || 
|-id=215 bgcolor=#fefefe
| 521215 ||  || — || January 27, 2007 || Kitt Peak || Spacewatch ||  || align=right data-sort-value="0.65" | 650 m || 
|-id=216 bgcolor=#E9E9E9
| 521216 ||  || — || November 6, 2013 || Haleakala || Pan-STARRS ||  || align=right | 1.2 km || 
|-id=217 bgcolor=#E9E9E9
| 521217 ||  || — || March 4, 2006 || Kitt Peak || Spacewatch ||  || align=right | 1.7 km || 
|-id=218 bgcolor=#E9E9E9
| 521218 ||  || — || October 18, 2012 || Haleakala || Pan-STARRS ||  || align=right | 1.6 km || 
|-id=219 bgcolor=#fefefe
| 521219 ||  || — || March 9, 2011 || Mount Lemmon || Mount Lemmon Survey ||  || align=right data-sort-value="0.66" | 660 m || 
|-id=220 bgcolor=#d6d6d6
| 521220 ||  || — || September 25, 2011 || Haleakala || Pan-STARRS ||  || align=right | 2.7 km || 
|-id=221 bgcolor=#d6d6d6
| 521221 ||  || — || April 10, 2015 || Mount Lemmon || Mount Lemmon Survey ||  || align=right | 3.2 km || 
|-id=222 bgcolor=#E9E9E9
| 521222 ||  || — || January 25, 2014 || Haleakala || Pan-STARRS ||  || align=right | 1.5 km || 
|-id=223 bgcolor=#E9E9E9
| 521223 ||  || — || February 10, 2014 || Mount Lemmon || Mount Lemmon Survey ||  || align=right | 1.8 km || 
|-id=224 bgcolor=#d6d6d6
| 521224 ||  || — || April 13, 2015 || Haleakala || Pan-STARRS ||  || align=right | 2.3 km || 
|-id=225 bgcolor=#d6d6d6
| 521225 ||  || — || April 13, 2015 || Haleakala || Pan-STARRS ||  || align=right | 2.2 km || 
|-id=226 bgcolor=#d6d6d6
| 521226 ||  || — || November 11, 2007 || Mount Lemmon || Mount Lemmon Survey ||  || align=right | 2.9 km || 
|-id=227 bgcolor=#E9E9E9
| 521227 ||  || — || April 13, 2015 || Haleakala || Pan-STARRS ||  || align=right | 1.3 km || 
|-id=228 bgcolor=#d6d6d6
| 521228 ||  || — || March 3, 2009 || Mount Lemmon || Mount Lemmon Survey ||  || align=right | 2.5 km || 
|-id=229 bgcolor=#d6d6d6
| 521229 ||  || — || June 11, 2005 || Kitt Peak || Spacewatch ||  || align=right | 2.7 km || 
|-id=230 bgcolor=#fefefe
| 521230 ||  || — || September 28, 2009 || Kitt Peak || Spacewatch ||  || align=right data-sort-value="0.66" | 660 m || 
|-id=231 bgcolor=#fefefe
| 521231 ||  || — || March 17, 2015 || Kitt Peak || Spacewatch ||  || align=right data-sort-value="0.54" | 540 m || 
|-id=232 bgcolor=#d6d6d6
| 521232 ||  || — || February 13, 2009 || Mount Lemmon || Mount Lemmon Survey ||  || align=right | 2.9 km || 
|-id=233 bgcolor=#d6d6d6
| 521233 ||  || — || April 18, 2015 || Kitt Peak || Spacewatch ||  || align=right | 3.1 km || 
|-id=234 bgcolor=#d6d6d6
| 521234 ||  || — || August 30, 2011 || Haleakala || Pan-STARRS ||  || align=right | 3.0 km || 
|-id=235 bgcolor=#d6d6d6
| 521235 ||  || — || November 17, 2007 || Kitt Peak || Spacewatch ||  || align=right | 2.4 km || 
|-id=236 bgcolor=#E9E9E9
| 521236 ||  || — || January 25, 2014 || Haleakala || Pan-STARRS ||  || align=right | 1.2 km || 
|-id=237 bgcolor=#fefefe
| 521237 ||  || — || November 30, 2006 || Kitt Peak || Spacewatch ||  || align=right data-sort-value="0.91" | 910 m || 
|-id=238 bgcolor=#E9E9E9
| 521238 ||  || — || October 9, 2012 || Haleakala || Pan-STARRS ||  || align=right | 1.0 km || 
|-id=239 bgcolor=#d6d6d6
| 521239 ||  || — || September 28, 2006 || Kitt Peak || Spacewatch ||  || align=right | 3.0 km || 
|-id=240 bgcolor=#E9E9E9
| 521240 ||  || — || April 18, 2015 || Haleakala || Pan-STARRS ||  || align=right | 1.1 km || 
|-id=241 bgcolor=#d6d6d6
| 521241 ||  || — || April 2, 2009 || Mount Lemmon || Mount Lemmon Survey ||  || align=right | 2.4 km || 
|-id=242 bgcolor=#E9E9E9
| 521242 ||  || — || April 23, 2011 || Kitt Peak || Spacewatch ||  || align=right | 1.2 km || 
|-id=243 bgcolor=#fefefe
| 521243 ||  || — || February 25, 2011 || Mount Lemmon || Mount Lemmon Survey ||  || align=right data-sort-value="0.65" | 650 m || 
|-id=244 bgcolor=#E9E9E9
| 521244 ||  || — || October 21, 2012 || Haleakala || Pan-STARRS ||  || align=right | 2.0 km || 
|-id=245 bgcolor=#d6d6d6
| 521245 ||  || — || September 24, 2011 || Mount Lemmon || Mount Lemmon Survey ||  || align=right | 2.3 km || 
|-id=246 bgcolor=#fefefe
| 521246 ||  || — || March 6, 2011 || Mount Lemmon || Mount Lemmon Survey ||  || align=right data-sort-value="0.66" | 660 m || 
|-id=247 bgcolor=#E9E9E9
| 521247 ||  || — || December 19, 2004 || Mount Lemmon || Mount Lemmon Survey ||  || align=right | 2.3 km || 
|-id=248 bgcolor=#E9E9E9
| 521248 ||  || — || June 4, 2011 || Mount Lemmon || Mount Lemmon Survey ||  || align=right | 1.4 km || 
|-id=249 bgcolor=#E9E9E9
| 521249 ||  || — || November 18, 2008 || Kitt Peak || Spacewatch ||  || align=right | 1.7 km || 
|-id=250 bgcolor=#E9E9E9
| 521250 ||  || — || June 8, 2011 || Mount Lemmon || Mount Lemmon Survey ||  || align=right | 2.1 km || 
|-id=251 bgcolor=#d6d6d6
| 521251 ||  || — || October 11, 2012 || Kitt Peak || Spacewatch ||  || align=right | 1.8 km || 
|-id=252 bgcolor=#d6d6d6
| 521252 ||  || — || October 22, 2012 || Haleakala || Pan-STARRS ||  || align=right | 3.0 km || 
|-id=253 bgcolor=#d6d6d6
| 521253 ||  || — || March 30, 2015 || Haleakala || Pan-STARRS ||  || align=right | 2.3 km || 
|-id=254 bgcolor=#d6d6d6
| 521254 ||  || — || September 17, 2012 || Kitt Peak || Spacewatch ||  || align=right | 2.4 km || 
|-id=255 bgcolor=#d6d6d6
| 521255 ||  || — || September 4, 2011 || Haleakala || Pan-STARRS ||  || align=right | 2.3 km || 
|-id=256 bgcolor=#fefefe
| 521256 ||  || — || March 24, 2015 || Mount Lemmon || Mount Lemmon Survey ||  || align=right data-sort-value="0.81" | 810 m || 
|-id=257 bgcolor=#d6d6d6
| 521257 ||  || — || April 23, 2015 || Haleakala || Pan-STARRS ||  || align=right | 1.9 km || 
|-id=258 bgcolor=#d6d6d6
| 521258 ||  || — || October 12, 2007 || Mount Lemmon || Mount Lemmon Survey ||  || align=right | 2.1 km || 
|-id=259 bgcolor=#d6d6d6
| 521259 ||  || — || October 1, 2005 || Catalina || CSS ||  || align=right | 3.2 km || 
|-id=260 bgcolor=#d6d6d6
| 521260 ||  || — || October 20, 2011 || Mount Lemmon || Mount Lemmon Survey ||  || align=right | 2.2 km || 
|-id=261 bgcolor=#d6d6d6
| 521261 ||  || — || December 3, 2012 || Mount Lemmon || Mount Lemmon Survey ||  || align=right | 2.2 km || 
|-id=262 bgcolor=#d6d6d6
| 521262 ||  || — || October 28, 2005 || Mount Lemmon || Mount Lemmon Survey || 7:4 || align=right | 2.8 km || 
|-id=263 bgcolor=#d6d6d6
| 521263 ||  || — || April 23, 2015 || Kitt Peak || Spacewatch ||  || align=right | 2.6 km || 
|-id=264 bgcolor=#d6d6d6
| 521264 ||  || — || November 7, 2012 || Kitt Peak || Spacewatch ||  || align=right | 2.4 km || 
|-id=265 bgcolor=#E9E9E9
| 521265 ||  || — || August 24, 2007 || Kitt Peak || Spacewatch ||  || align=right | 1.7 km || 
|-id=266 bgcolor=#E9E9E9
| 521266 ||  || — || September 28, 2008 || Mount Lemmon || Mount Lemmon Survey ||  || align=right | 1.8 km || 
|-id=267 bgcolor=#fefefe
| 521267 ||  || — || December 26, 2006 || Kitt Peak || Spacewatch ||  || align=right data-sort-value="0.82" | 820 m || 
|-id=268 bgcolor=#E9E9E9
| 521268 ||  || — || May 20, 2006 || Kitt Peak || Spacewatch ||  || align=right | 2.3 km || 
|-id=269 bgcolor=#d6d6d6
| 521269 ||  || — || November 27, 2012 || Mount Lemmon || Mount Lemmon Survey ||  || align=right | 2.7 km || 
|-id=270 bgcolor=#d6d6d6
| 521270 ||  || — || April 25, 2015 || Haleakala || Pan-STARRS ||  || align=right | 2.2 km || 
|-id=271 bgcolor=#E9E9E9
| 521271 ||  || — || October 8, 2012 || Haleakala || Pan-STARRS ||  || align=right | 2.0 km || 
|-id=272 bgcolor=#E9E9E9
| 521272 ||  || — || April 25, 2015 || Haleakala || Pan-STARRS ||  || align=right | 1.9 km || 
|-id=273 bgcolor=#d6d6d6
| 521273 ||  || — || September 25, 2011 || Haleakala || Pan-STARRS ||  || align=right | 2.5 km || 
|-id=274 bgcolor=#d6d6d6
| 521274 ||  || — || September 24, 2011 || Mount Lemmon || Mount Lemmon Survey ||  || align=right | 2.7 km || 
|-id=275 bgcolor=#d6d6d6
| 521275 ||  || — || February 8, 2008 || Mount Lemmon || Mount Lemmon Survey ||  || align=right | 2.6 km || 
|-id=276 bgcolor=#E9E9E9
| 521276 ||  || — || March 16, 2010 || Kitt Peak || Spacewatch ||  || align=right | 1.0 km || 
|-id=277 bgcolor=#d6d6d6
| 521277 ||  || — || October 26, 2011 || Haleakala || Pan-STARRS ||  || align=right | 2.5 km || 
|-id=278 bgcolor=#d6d6d6
| 521278 ||  || — || September 20, 2011 || Mount Lemmon || Mount Lemmon Survey ||  || align=right | 2.2 km || 
|-id=279 bgcolor=#E9E9E9
| 521279 ||  || — || September 25, 2012 || Mount Lemmon || Mount Lemmon Survey ||  || align=right | 2.2 km || 
|-id=280 bgcolor=#d6d6d6
| 521280 ||  || — || March 16, 2009 || Kitt Peak || Spacewatch ||  || align=right | 2.3 km || 
|-id=281 bgcolor=#d6d6d6
| 521281 ||  || — || February 3, 2009 || Kitt Peak || Spacewatch ||  || align=right | 1.8 km || 
|-id=282 bgcolor=#d6d6d6
| 521282 ||  || — || October 21, 2007 || Mount Lemmon || Mount Lemmon Survey ||  || align=right | 2.7 km || 
|-id=283 bgcolor=#E9E9E9
| 521283 ||  || — || January 1, 2014 || Kitt Peak || Spacewatch ||  || align=right | 2.0 km || 
|-id=284 bgcolor=#d6d6d6
| 521284 ||  || — || November 5, 2007 || Kitt Peak || Spacewatch ||  || align=right | 2.4 km || 
|-id=285 bgcolor=#d6d6d6
| 521285 ||  || — || September 15, 2007 || Mount Lemmon || Mount Lemmon Survey ||  || align=right | 2.2 km || 
|-id=286 bgcolor=#fefefe
| 521286 ||  || — || February 13, 2011 || Mount Lemmon || Mount Lemmon Survey ||  || align=right data-sort-value="0.68" | 680 m || 
|-id=287 bgcolor=#E9E9E9
| 521287 ||  || — || May 13, 2011 || Mount Lemmon || Mount Lemmon Survey ||  || align=right | 1.0 km || 
|-id=288 bgcolor=#d6d6d6
| 521288 ||  || — || May 13, 2015 || Haleakala || Pan-STARRS ||  || align=right | 2.7 km || 
|-id=289 bgcolor=#d6d6d6
| 521289 ||  || — || February 28, 2014 || Haleakala || Pan-STARRS ||  || align=right | 2.4 km || 
|-id=290 bgcolor=#d6d6d6
| 521290 ||  || — || January 11, 2008 || Kitt Peak || Spacewatch ||  || align=right | 2.9 km || 
|-id=291 bgcolor=#d6d6d6
| 521291 ||  || — || January 23, 2014 || Mount Lemmon || Mount Lemmon Survey ||  || align=right | 2.8 km || 
|-id=292 bgcolor=#d6d6d6
| 521292 ||  || — || March 24, 2009 || Kitt Peak || Spacewatch ||  || align=right | 3.0 km || 
|-id=293 bgcolor=#fefefe
| 521293 ||  || — || August 13, 2012 || Kitt Peak || Spacewatch ||  || align=right data-sort-value="0.75" | 750 m || 
|-id=294 bgcolor=#d6d6d6
| 521294 ||  || — || May 15, 2015 || Haleakala || Pan-STARRS ||  || align=right | 2.5 km || 
|-id=295 bgcolor=#d6d6d6
| 521295 ||  || — || December 7, 2008 || Mount Lemmon || Mount Lemmon Survey ||  || align=right | 2.3 km || 
|-id=296 bgcolor=#d6d6d6
| 521296 ||  || — || May 15, 2015 || Haleakala || Pan-STARRS ||  || align=right | 2.0 km || 
|-id=297 bgcolor=#d6d6d6
| 521297 ||  || — || February 10, 2014 || Haleakala || Pan-STARRS ||  || align=right | 2.0 km || 
|-id=298 bgcolor=#E9E9E9
| 521298 ||  || — || January 31, 2006 || Catalina || CSS ||  || align=right | 1.4 km || 
|-id=299 bgcolor=#fefefe
| 521299 ||  || — || April 8, 2008 || Kitt Peak || Spacewatch ||  || align=right data-sort-value="0.84" | 840 m || 
|-id=300 bgcolor=#d6d6d6
| 521300 ||  || — || May 18, 2015 || Mount Lemmon || Mount Lemmon Survey ||  || align=right | 2.3 km || 
|}

521301–521400 

|-bgcolor=#d6d6d6
| 521301 ||  || — || April 7, 2003 || Kitt Peak || Spacewatch ||  || align=right | 2.4 km || 
|-id=302 bgcolor=#d6d6d6
| 521302 ||  || — || March 30, 2014 || Catalina || CSS ||  || align=right | 2.8 km || 
|-id=303 bgcolor=#d6d6d6
| 521303 ||  || — || March 30, 2003 || Anderson Mesa || LONEOS ||  || align=right | 3.5 km || 
|-id=304 bgcolor=#d6d6d6
| 521304 ||  || — || March 24, 2009 || Mount Lemmon || Mount Lemmon Survey ||  || align=right | 2.7 km || 
|-id=305 bgcolor=#d6d6d6
| 521305 ||  || — || October 25, 2011 || Haleakala || Pan-STARRS ||  || align=right | 3.1 km || 
|-id=306 bgcolor=#fefefe
| 521306 ||  || — || March 10, 2007 || Kitt Peak || Spacewatch ||  || align=right data-sort-value="0.68" | 680 m || 
|-id=307 bgcolor=#d6d6d6
| 521307 ||  || — || September 7, 2011 || Kitt Peak || Spacewatch ||  || align=right | 2.6 km || 
|-id=308 bgcolor=#d6d6d6
| 521308 ||  || — || February 24, 2014 || Haleakala || Pan-STARRS ||  || align=right | 2.4 km || 
|-id=309 bgcolor=#E9E9E9
| 521309 ||  || — || February 25, 2006 || Kitt Peak || Spacewatch ||  || align=right | 1.2 km || 
|-id=310 bgcolor=#E9E9E9
| 521310 ||  || — || April 30, 2006 || Kitt Peak || Spacewatch ||  || align=right | 1.4 km || 
|-id=311 bgcolor=#fefefe
| 521311 ||  || — || October 25, 2009 || Kitt Peak || Spacewatch ||  || align=right data-sort-value="0.67" | 670 m || 
|-id=312 bgcolor=#d6d6d6
| 521312 ||  || — || December 4, 2007 || Mount Lemmon || Mount Lemmon Survey ||  || align=right | 1.9 km || 
|-id=313 bgcolor=#E9E9E9
| 521313 ||  || — || March 19, 2010 || Mount Lemmon || Mount Lemmon Survey ||  || align=right | 1.7 km || 
|-id=314 bgcolor=#fefefe
| 521314 ||  || — || October 7, 2012 || Haleakala || Pan-STARRS ||  || align=right data-sort-value="0.78" | 780 m || 
|-id=315 bgcolor=#E9E9E9
| 521315 ||  || — || September 16, 2012 || Kitt Peak || Spacewatch ||  || align=right | 1.2 km || 
|-id=316 bgcolor=#E9E9E9
| 521316 ||  || — || November 7, 2012 || Mount Lemmon || Mount Lemmon Survey ||  || align=right | 1.5 km || 
|-id=317 bgcolor=#fefefe
| 521317 ||  || — || March 31, 2008 || Mount Lemmon || Mount Lemmon Survey ||  || align=right data-sort-value="0.69" | 690 m || 
|-id=318 bgcolor=#d6d6d6
| 521318 ||  || — || September 24, 2011 || Haleakala || Pan-STARRS ||  || align=right | 2.3 km || 
|-id=319 bgcolor=#d6d6d6
| 521319 ||  || — || October 27, 2011 || Mount Lemmon || Mount Lemmon Survey ||  || align=right | 3.3 km || 
|-id=320 bgcolor=#d6d6d6
| 521320 ||  || — || December 9, 2012 || Haleakala || Pan-STARRS ||  || align=right | 2.6 km || 
|-id=321 bgcolor=#d6d6d6
| 521321 ||  || — || February 26, 2014 || Mount Lemmon || Mount Lemmon Survey ||  || align=right | 3.1 km || 
|-id=322 bgcolor=#E9E9E9
| 521322 ||  || — || May 25, 2015 || Haleakala || Pan-STARRS ||  || align=right | 1.0 km || 
|-id=323 bgcolor=#E9E9E9
| 521323 ||  || — || June 22, 2011 || Kitt Peak || Spacewatch ||  || align=right | 1.4 km || 
|-id=324 bgcolor=#fefefe
| 521324 ||  || — || August 10, 2012 || Kitt Peak || Spacewatch ||  || align=right data-sort-value="0.77" | 770 m || 
|-id=325 bgcolor=#d6d6d6
| 521325 ||  || — || May 26, 2015 || Haleakala || Pan-STARRS ||  || align=right | 2.1 km || 
|-id=326 bgcolor=#d6d6d6
| 521326 ||  || — || September 4, 2011 || Haleakala || Pan-STARRS ||  || align=right | 2.3 km || 
|-id=327 bgcolor=#E9E9E9
| 521327 ||  || — || October 18, 2011 || Haleakala || Pan-STARRS ||  || align=right | 1.8 km || 
|-id=328 bgcolor=#fefefe
| 521328 ||  || — || May 14, 2008 || Mount Lemmon || Mount Lemmon Survey ||  || align=right data-sort-value="0.60" | 600 m || 
|-id=329 bgcolor=#E9E9E9
| 521329 ||  || — || October 24, 2011 || Haleakala || Pan-STARRS ||  || align=right | 2.1 km || 
|-id=330 bgcolor=#d6d6d6
| 521330 ||  || — || June 21, 2010 || Mount Lemmon || Mount Lemmon Survey ||  || align=right | 2.4 km || 
|-id=331 bgcolor=#E9E9E9
| 521331 ||  || — || September 20, 2007 || Kitt Peak || Spacewatch ||  || align=right | 1.4 km || 
|-id=332 bgcolor=#d6d6d6
| 521332 ||  || — || February 10, 2008 || Kitt Peak || Spacewatch ||  || align=right | 2.8 km || 
|-id=333 bgcolor=#d6d6d6
| 521333 ||  || — || March 30, 2009 || Mount Lemmon || Mount Lemmon Survey ||  || align=right | 2.7 km || 
|-id=334 bgcolor=#fefefe
| 521334 ||  || — || February 16, 2004 || Kitt Peak || Spacewatch ||  || align=right data-sort-value="0.71" | 710 m || 
|-id=335 bgcolor=#fefefe
| 521335 ||  || — || April 20, 2007 || Kitt Peak || Spacewatch ||  || align=right data-sort-value="0.78" | 780 m || 
|-id=336 bgcolor=#d6d6d6
| 521336 ||  || — || December 31, 2013 || Haleakala || Pan-STARRS ||  || align=right | 2.4 km || 
|-id=337 bgcolor=#E9E9E9
| 521337 ||  || — || January 25, 2014 || Haleakala || Pan-STARRS ||  || align=right | 2.2 km || 
|-id=338 bgcolor=#E9E9E9
| 521338 ||  || — || May 7, 2014 || Haleakala || Pan-STARRS ||  || align=right | 1.8 km || 
|-id=339 bgcolor=#d6d6d6
| 521339 ||  || — || February 15, 2013 || Haleakala || Pan-STARRS ||  || align=right | 2.9 km || 
|-id=340 bgcolor=#d6d6d6
| 521340 ||  || — || September 19, 2011 || Haleakala || Pan-STARRS ||  || align=right | 3.1 km || 
|-id=341 bgcolor=#E9E9E9
| 521341 ||  || — || June 13, 2015 || Haleakala || Pan-STARRS ||  || align=right | 1.9 km || 
|-id=342 bgcolor=#fefefe
| 521342 ||  || — || March 13, 2007 || Kitt Peak || Spacewatch ||  || align=right data-sort-value="0.80" | 800 m || 
|-id=343 bgcolor=#d6d6d6
| 521343 ||  || — || October 21, 2006 || Mount Lemmon || Mount Lemmon Survey ||  || align=right | 2.9 km || 
|-id=344 bgcolor=#E9E9E9
| 521344 ||  || — || July 1, 2011 || Mount Lemmon || Mount Lemmon Survey ||  || align=right data-sort-value="0.86" | 860 m || 
|-id=345 bgcolor=#d6d6d6
| 521345 ||  || — || November 25, 2005 || Catalina || CSS ||  || align=right | 2.9 km || 
|-id=346 bgcolor=#E9E9E9
| 521346 ||  || — || July 26, 2011 || Haleakala || Pan-STARRS ||  || align=right | 1.2 km || 
|-id=347 bgcolor=#E9E9E9
| 521347 ||  || — || September 14, 2007 || Mount Lemmon || Mount Lemmon Survey ||  || align=right | 1.3 km || 
|-id=348 bgcolor=#d6d6d6
| 521348 ||  || — || February 25, 2014 || Kitt Peak || Spacewatch ||  || align=right | 2.3 km || 
|-id=349 bgcolor=#E9E9E9
| 521349 ||  || — || February 27, 2014 || Kitt Peak || Spacewatch ||  || align=right | 1.2 km || 
|-id=350 bgcolor=#E9E9E9
| 521350 ||  || — || February 9, 2010 || Kitt Peak || Spacewatch ||  || align=right | 1.1 km || 
|-id=351 bgcolor=#E9E9E9
| 521351 ||  || — || February 28, 2014 || Haleakala || Pan-STARRS ||  || align=right | 1.1 km || 
|-id=352 bgcolor=#E9E9E9
| 521352 ||  || — || June 15, 2015 || Haleakala || Pan-STARRS ||  || align=right | 1.1 km || 
|-id=353 bgcolor=#d6d6d6
| 521353 ||  || — || February 13, 2013 || Haleakala || Pan-STARRS ||  || align=right | 2.4 km || 
|-id=354 bgcolor=#d6d6d6
| 521354 ||  || — || October 29, 2006 || Kitt Peak || Spacewatch ||  || align=right | 2.2 km || 
|-id=355 bgcolor=#d6d6d6
| 521355 ||  || — || December 4, 2012 || Mount Lemmon || Mount Lemmon Survey ||  || align=right | 2.5 km || 
|-id=356 bgcolor=#fefefe
| 521356 ||  || — || January 5, 2014 || Haleakala || Pan-STARRS ||  || align=right data-sort-value="0.87" | 870 m || 
|-id=357 bgcolor=#fefefe
| 521357 ||  || — || April 14, 2008 || Kitt Peak || Spacewatch ||  || align=right data-sort-value="0.59" | 590 m || 
|-id=358 bgcolor=#fefefe
| 521358 ||  || — || November 22, 2006 || Kitt Peak || Spacewatch ||  || align=right data-sort-value="0.49" | 490 m || 
|-id=359 bgcolor=#fefefe
| 521359 ||  || — || August 25, 2000 || Socorro || LINEAR ||  || align=right | 1.9 km || 
|-id=360 bgcolor=#fefefe
| 521360 ||  || — || October 22, 2012 || Mount Lemmon || Mount Lemmon Survey ||  || align=right data-sort-value="0.88" | 880 m || 
|-id=361 bgcolor=#fefefe
| 521361 ||  || — || June 25, 2015 || Haleakala || Pan-STARRS ||  || align=right data-sort-value="0.67" | 670 m || 
|-id=362 bgcolor=#d6d6d6
| 521362 ||  || — || November 17, 2011 || Kitt Peak || Spacewatch ||  || align=right | 3.0 km || 
|-id=363 bgcolor=#d6d6d6
| 521363 ||  || — || March 29, 2014 || Kitt Peak || Spacewatch ||  || align=right | 1.8 km || 
|-id=364 bgcolor=#E9E9E9
| 521364 ||  || — || February 27, 2009 || Kitt Peak || Spacewatch ||  || align=right | 1.8 km || 
|-id=365 bgcolor=#d6d6d6
| 521365 ||  || — || June 17, 2015 || Haleakala || Pan-STARRS ||  || align=right | 2.2 km || 
|-id=366 bgcolor=#d6d6d6
| 521366 ||  || — || June 17, 2015 || Haleakala || Pan-STARRS ||  || align=right | 2.7 km || 
|-id=367 bgcolor=#d6d6d6
| 521367 ||  || — || October 26, 2011 || Haleakala || Pan-STARRS ||  || align=right | 2.9 km || 
|-id=368 bgcolor=#d6d6d6
| 521368 ||  || — || February 14, 2013 || Haleakala || Pan-STARRS ||  || align=right | 2.5 km || 
|-id=369 bgcolor=#fefefe
| 521369 ||  || — || May 3, 2011 || Mount Lemmon || Mount Lemmon Survey ||  || align=right data-sort-value="0.61" | 610 m || 
|-id=370 bgcolor=#d6d6d6
| 521370 ||  || — || April 4, 2008 || Kitt Peak || Spacewatch ||  || align=right | 3.1 km || 
|-id=371 bgcolor=#E9E9E9
| 521371 ||  || — || September 23, 2011 || Haleakala || Pan-STARRS ||  || align=right | 1.9 km || 
|-id=372 bgcolor=#E9E9E9
| 521372 ||  || — || February 28, 2014 || Haleakala || Pan-STARRS ||  || align=right | 1.9 km || 
|-id=373 bgcolor=#fefefe
| 521373 ||  || — || September 21, 2012 || Mount Lemmon || Mount Lemmon Survey ||  || align=right data-sort-value="0.67" | 670 m || 
|-id=374 bgcolor=#E9E9E9
| 521374 ||  || — || August 19, 2006 || Kitt Peak || Spacewatch ||  || align=right | 1.8 km || 
|-id=375 bgcolor=#d6d6d6
| 521375 ||  || — || April 1, 2008 || Kitt Peak || Spacewatch ||  || align=right | 2.5 km || 
|-id=376 bgcolor=#E9E9E9
| 521376 ||  || — || November 10, 2004 || Kitt Peak || Spacewatch ||  || align=right data-sort-value="0.87" | 870 m || 
|-id=377 bgcolor=#d6d6d6
| 521377 ||  || — || January 7, 2013 || Kitt Peak || Spacewatch ||  || align=right | 2.7 km || 
|-id=378 bgcolor=#d6d6d6
| 521378 ||  || — || January 27, 2012 || Mount Lemmon || Mount Lemmon Survey ||  || align=right | 2.3 km || 
|-id=379 bgcolor=#d6d6d6
| 521379 ||  || — || June 18, 2015 || Haleakala || Pan-STARRS ||  || align=right | 2.7 km || 
|-id=380 bgcolor=#E9E9E9
| 521380 ||  || — || June 18, 2015 || Haleakala || Pan-STARRS ||  || align=right data-sort-value="0.87" | 870 m || 
|-id=381 bgcolor=#d6d6d6
| 521381 ||  || — || January 20, 2013 || Mount Lemmon || Mount Lemmon Survey ||  || align=right | 2.9 km || 
|-id=382 bgcolor=#E9E9E9
| 521382 ||  || — || November 5, 2007 || Kitt Peak || Spacewatch ||  || align=right | 2.1 km || 
|-id=383 bgcolor=#d6d6d6
| 521383 ||  || — || January 3, 2013 || Mount Lemmon || Mount Lemmon Survey ||  || align=right | 2.6 km || 
|-id=384 bgcolor=#E9E9E9
| 521384 ||  || — || November 8, 2007 || Kitt Peak || Spacewatch ||  || align=right | 2.1 km || 
|-id=385 bgcolor=#fefefe
| 521385 ||  || — || April 14, 2007 || Mount Lemmon || Mount Lemmon Survey ||  || align=right data-sort-value="0.62" | 620 m || 
|-id=386 bgcolor=#d6d6d6
| 521386 ||  || — || June 20, 2015 || Haleakala || Pan-STARRS ||  || align=right | 2.4 km || 
|-id=387 bgcolor=#E9E9E9
| 521387 ||  || — || February 22, 2009 || Kitt Peak || Spacewatch ||  || align=right | 2.1 km || 
|-id=388 bgcolor=#d6d6d6
| 521388 ||  || — || September 18, 2010 || Mount Lemmon || Mount Lemmon Survey ||  || align=right | 2.5 km || 
|-id=389 bgcolor=#E9E9E9
| 521389 ||  || — || June 20, 2015 || Haleakala || Pan-STARRS ||  || align=right | 1.6 km || 
|-id=390 bgcolor=#fefefe
| 521390 ||  || — || October 8, 2008 || Kitt Peak || Spacewatch ||  || align=right data-sort-value="0.80" | 800 m || 
|-id=391 bgcolor=#E9E9E9
| 521391 ||  || — || September 4, 2011 || Haleakala || Pan-STARRS ||  || align=right | 1.4 km || 
|-id=392 bgcolor=#d6d6d6
| 521392 ||  || — || December 25, 2006 || Kitt Peak || Spacewatch ||  || align=right | 3.1 km || 
|-id=393 bgcolor=#d6d6d6
| 521393 ||  || — || June 12, 2004 || Kitt Peak || Spacewatch ||  || align=right | 2.5 km || 
|-id=394 bgcolor=#E9E9E9
| 521394 ||  || — || January 17, 2013 || Haleakala || Pan-STARRS ||  || align=right | 1.9 km || 
|-id=395 bgcolor=#d6d6d6
| 521395 ||  || — || September 16, 2010 || Mount Lemmon || Mount Lemmon Survey ||  || align=right | 2.7 km || 
|-id=396 bgcolor=#E9E9E9
| 521396 ||  || — || September 10, 2007 || Mount Lemmon || Mount Lemmon Survey ||  || align=right data-sort-value="0.90" | 900 m || 
|-id=397 bgcolor=#d6d6d6
| 521397 ||  || — || June 22, 2015 || Haleakala || Pan-STARRS ||  || align=right | 3.5 km || 
|-id=398 bgcolor=#fefefe
| 521398 ||  || — || November 22, 2008 || Kitt Peak || Spacewatch ||  || align=right | 1.1 km || 
|-id=399 bgcolor=#d6d6d6
| 521399 ||  || — || November 23, 2006 || Mount Lemmon || Mount Lemmon Survey ||  || align=right | 3.2 km || 
|-id=400 bgcolor=#d6d6d6
| 521400 ||  || — || March 11, 2005 || Mount Lemmon || Mount Lemmon Survey ||  || align=right | 2.3 km || 
|}

521401–521500 

|-bgcolor=#E9E9E9
| 521401 ||  || — || August 27, 2006 || Kitt Peak || Spacewatch ||  || align=right | 1.8 km || 
|-id=402 bgcolor=#d6d6d6
| 521402 ||  || — || February 9, 2008 || Kitt Peak || Spacewatch ||  || align=right | 3.0 km || 
|-id=403 bgcolor=#d6d6d6
| 521403 ||  || — || January 18, 2013 || Haleakala || Pan-STARRS ||  || align=right | 3.0 km || 
|-id=404 bgcolor=#d6d6d6
| 521404 ||  || — || March 29, 2008 || Mount Lemmon || Mount Lemmon Survey ||  || align=right | 3.4 km || 
|-id=405 bgcolor=#d6d6d6
| 521405 ||  || — || October 30, 2005 || Mount Lemmon || Mount Lemmon Survey ||  || align=right | 3.2 km || 
|-id=406 bgcolor=#d6d6d6
| 521406 ||  || — || December 13, 2006 || Mount Lemmon || Mount Lemmon Survey ||  || align=right | 2.2 km || 
|-id=407 bgcolor=#d6d6d6
| 521407 ||  || — || January 19, 2012 || Kitt Peak || Spacewatch ||  || align=right | 3.8 km || 
|-id=408 bgcolor=#d6d6d6
| 521408 ||  || — || November 14, 2010 || Kitt Peak || Spacewatch ||  || align=right | 2.7 km || 
|-id=409 bgcolor=#E9E9E9
| 521409 ||  || — || January 18, 2013 || Haleakala || Pan-STARRS ||  || align=right | 2.1 km || 
|-id=410 bgcolor=#d6d6d6
| 521410 ||  || — || January 30, 2008 || Mount Lemmon || Mount Lemmon Survey ||  || align=right | 2.7 km || 
|-id=411 bgcolor=#E9E9E9
| 521411 ||  || — || April 4, 2014 || Haleakala || Pan-STARRS ||  || align=right | 1.9 km || 
|-id=412 bgcolor=#E9E9E9
| 521412 ||  || — || October 9, 2007 || Mount Lemmon || Mount Lemmon Survey ||  || align=right | 1.5 km || 
|-id=413 bgcolor=#d6d6d6
| 521413 ||  || — || April 30, 2014 || Haleakala || Pan-STARRS ||  || align=right | 2.2 km || 
|-id=414 bgcolor=#d6d6d6
| 521414 ||  || — || September 30, 2006 || Kitt Peak || Spacewatch ||  || align=right | 2.2 km || 
|-id=415 bgcolor=#E9E9E9
| 521415 ||  || — || August 19, 2006 || Kitt Peak || Spacewatch ||  || align=right | 1.6 km || 
|-id=416 bgcolor=#d6d6d6
| 521416 ||  || — || September 28, 2006 || Kitt Peak || Spacewatch ||  || align=right | 2.1 km || 
|-id=417 bgcolor=#d6d6d6
| 521417 ||  || — || January 19, 2012 || Haleakala || Pan-STARRS ||  || align=right | 2.3 km || 
|-id=418 bgcolor=#d6d6d6
| 521418 ||  || — || November 10, 2010 || Mount Lemmon || Mount Lemmon Survey ||  || align=right | 2.3 km || 
|-id=419 bgcolor=#E9E9E9
| 521419 ||  || — || September 29, 2011 || Kitt Peak || Spacewatch ||  || align=right | 1.8 km || 
|-id=420 bgcolor=#d6d6d6
| 521420 ||  || — || September 17, 2010 || Mount Lemmon || Mount Lemmon Survey ||  || align=right | 2.5 km || 
|-id=421 bgcolor=#d6d6d6
| 521421 ||  || — || May 13, 2009 || Kitt Peak || Spacewatch ||  || align=right | 2.5 km || 
|-id=422 bgcolor=#d6d6d6
| 521422 ||  || — || October 31, 2011 || Mount Lemmon || Mount Lemmon Survey ||  || align=right | 2.0 km || 
|-id=423 bgcolor=#E9E9E9
| 521423 ||  || — || August 10, 2007 || Kitt Peak || Spacewatch ||  || align=right data-sort-value="0.94" | 940 m || 
|-id=424 bgcolor=#E9E9E9
| 521424 ||  || — || November 17, 2011 || Kitt Peak || Spacewatch ||  || align=right | 1.7 km || 
|-id=425 bgcolor=#d6d6d6
| 521425 ||  || — || November 24, 2006 || Mount Lemmon || Mount Lemmon Survey ||  || align=right | 2.7 km || 
|-id=426 bgcolor=#E9E9E9
| 521426 ||  || — || March 13, 2005 || Kitt Peak || Spacewatch ||  || align=right | 1.3 km || 
|-id=427 bgcolor=#E9E9E9
| 521427 ||  || — || August 29, 2006 || Kitt Peak || Spacewatch ||  || align=right | 1.4 km || 
|-id=428 bgcolor=#d6d6d6
| 521428 ||  || — || April 5, 2008 || Mount Lemmon || Mount Lemmon Survey ||  || align=right | 2.9 km || 
|-id=429 bgcolor=#E9E9E9
| 521429 ||  || — || June 29, 2015 || Haleakala || Pan-STARRS ||  || align=right | 1.0 km || 
|-id=430 bgcolor=#d6d6d6
| 521430 ||  || — || June 29, 2015 || Haleakala || Pan-STARRS ||  || align=right | 2.5 km || 
|-id=431 bgcolor=#E9E9E9
| 521431 ||  || — || November 20, 2007 || Mount Lemmon || Mount Lemmon Survey ||  || align=right | 2.8 km || 
|-id=432 bgcolor=#d6d6d6
| 521432 ||  || — || June 29, 2015 || Haleakala || Pan-STARRS ||  || align=right | 2.9 km || 
|-id=433 bgcolor=#fefefe
| 521433 ||  || — || November 12, 2012 || Haleakala || Pan-STARRS ||  || align=right data-sort-value="0.62" | 620 m || 
|-id=434 bgcolor=#fefefe
| 521434 ||  || — || February 1, 2008 || Mount Lemmon || Mount Lemmon Survey ||  || align=right data-sort-value="0.71" | 710 m || 
|-id=435 bgcolor=#E9E9E9
| 521435 ||  || — || February 4, 2009 || Mount Lemmon || Mount Lemmon Survey ||  || align=right | 1.3 km || 
|-id=436 bgcolor=#E9E9E9
| 521436 ||  || — || January 26, 2014 || Haleakala || Pan-STARRS ||  || align=right | 1.6 km || 
|-id=437 bgcolor=#E9E9E9
| 521437 ||  || — || July 12, 2015 || Haleakala || Pan-STARRS ||  || align=right | 1.9 km || 
|-id=438 bgcolor=#d6d6d6
| 521438 ||  || — || September 18, 2010 || Mount Lemmon || Mount Lemmon Survey ||  || align=right | 3.3 km || 
|-id=439 bgcolor=#d6d6d6
| 521439 ||  || — || July 12, 2015 || Haleakala || Pan-STARRS ||  || align=right | 2.9 km || 
|-id=440 bgcolor=#E9E9E9
| 521440 ||  || — || July 14, 2015 || Haleakala || Pan-STARRS ||  || align=right | 1.6 km || 
|-id=441 bgcolor=#d6d6d6
| 521441 ||  || — || October 4, 1996 || Kitt Peak || Spacewatch ||  || align=right | 2.7 km || 
|-id=442 bgcolor=#E9E9E9
| 521442 ||  || — || November 2, 2007 || Kitt Peak || Spacewatch ||  || align=right | 1.6 km || 
|-id=443 bgcolor=#fefefe
| 521443 ||  || — || October 16, 2012 || Kitt Peak || Spacewatch ||  || align=right data-sort-value="0.82" | 820 m || 
|-id=444 bgcolor=#E9E9E9
| 521444 ||  || — || December 8, 2012 || Kitt Peak || Spacewatch ||  || align=right data-sort-value="0.85" | 850 m || 
|-id=445 bgcolor=#E9E9E9
| 521445 ||  || — || September 17, 2006 || Kitt Peak || Spacewatch ||  || align=right | 1.9 km || 
|-id=446 bgcolor=#fefefe
| 521446 ||  || — || November 5, 2005 || Mount Lemmon || Mount Lemmon Survey ||  || align=right data-sort-value="0.64" | 640 m || 
|-id=447 bgcolor=#fefefe
| 521447 ||  || — || October 10, 2005 || Kitt Peak || Spacewatch ||  || align=right data-sort-value="0.80" | 800 m || 
|-id=448 bgcolor=#E9E9E9
| 521448 ||  || — || August 23, 2007 || Kitt Peak || Spacewatch ||  || align=right | 1.1 km || 
|-id=449 bgcolor=#fefefe
| 521449 ||  || — || August 24, 2008 || Kitt Peak || Spacewatch ||  || align=right data-sort-value="0.86" | 860 m || 
|-id=450 bgcolor=#fefefe
| 521450 ||  || — || January 19, 1999 || Kitt Peak || Spacewatch ||  || align=right data-sort-value="0.94" | 940 m || 
|-id=451 bgcolor=#fefefe
| 521451 ||  || — || September 4, 2008 || Kitt Peak || Spacewatch ||  || align=right data-sort-value="0.75" | 750 m || 
|-id=452 bgcolor=#d6d6d6
| 521452 ||  || — || January 6, 2013 || Mount Lemmon || Mount Lemmon Survey ||  || align=right | 3.3 km || 
|-id=453 bgcolor=#fefefe
| 521453 ||  || — || January 7, 2010 || Kitt Peak || Spacewatch ||  || align=right data-sort-value="0.77" | 770 m || 
|-id=454 bgcolor=#fefefe
| 521454 ||  || — || November 20, 2009 || Kitt Peak || Spacewatch ||  || align=right data-sort-value="0.72" | 720 m || 
|-id=455 bgcolor=#fefefe
| 521455 ||  || — || July 24, 2015 || Haleakala || Pan-STARRS ||  || align=right data-sort-value="0.68" | 680 m || 
|-id=456 bgcolor=#E9E9E9
| 521456 ||  || — || October 29, 2003 || Kitt Peak || Spacewatch ||  || align=right | 1.1 km || 
|-id=457 bgcolor=#E9E9E9
| 521457 ||  || — || November 26, 2012 || Mount Lemmon || Mount Lemmon Survey ||  || align=right | 2.9 km || 
|-id=458 bgcolor=#d6d6d6
| 521458 ||  || — || January 1, 2012 || Mount Lemmon || Mount Lemmon Survey ||  || align=right | 2.6 km || 
|-id=459 bgcolor=#E9E9E9
| 521459 ||  || — || February 1, 2009 || Kitt Peak || Spacewatch ||  || align=right | 1.3 km || 
|-id=460 bgcolor=#d6d6d6
| 521460 ||  || — || May 25, 2014 || Haleakala || Pan-STARRS ||  || align=right | 3.2 km || 
|-id=461 bgcolor=#fefefe
| 521461 ||  || — || October 7, 2008 || Kitt Peak || Spacewatch ||  || align=right data-sort-value="0.82" | 820 m || 
|-id=462 bgcolor=#d6d6d6
| 521462 ||  || — || July 19, 2015 || Haleakala || Pan-STARRS ||  || align=right | 2.4 km || 
|-id=463 bgcolor=#E9E9E9
| 521463 ||  || — || September 27, 2011 || Mount Lemmon || Mount Lemmon Survey ||  || align=right | 2.5 km || 
|-id=464 bgcolor=#d6d6d6
| 521464 ||  || — || January 18, 2013 || Mount Lemmon || Mount Lemmon Survey ||  || align=right | 1.9 km || 
|-id=465 bgcolor=#E9E9E9
| 521465 ||  || — || September 23, 2011 || Kitt Peak || Spacewatch ||  || align=right | 1.7 km || 
|-id=466 bgcolor=#E9E9E9
| 521466 ||  || — || September 28, 2011 || Kitt Peak || Spacewatch ||  || align=right | 1.9 km || 
|-id=467 bgcolor=#d6d6d6
| 521467 ||  || — || September 25, 2005 || Kitt Peak || Spacewatch ||  || align=right | 3.0 km || 
|-id=468 bgcolor=#d6d6d6
| 521468 ||  || — || May 21, 2014 || Haleakala || Pan-STARRS ||  || align=right | 3.1 km || 
|-id=469 bgcolor=#d6d6d6
| 521469 ||  || — || October 24, 2011 || Haleakala || Pan-STARRS ||  || align=right | 1.9 km || 
|-id=470 bgcolor=#d6d6d6
| 521470 ||  || — || July 19, 2015 || Haleakala || Pan-STARRS ||  || align=right | 3.0 km || 
|-id=471 bgcolor=#d6d6d6
| 521471 ||  || — || October 17, 2010 || Mount Lemmon || Mount Lemmon Survey ||  || align=right | 2.8 km || 
|-id=472 bgcolor=#E9E9E9
| 521472 ||  || — || May 7, 2014 || Haleakala || Pan-STARRS ||  || align=right | 2.2 km || 
|-id=473 bgcolor=#d6d6d6
| 521473 ||  || — || August 10, 2010 || WISE || WISE ||  || align=right | 4.3 km || 
|-id=474 bgcolor=#E9E9E9
| 521474 ||  || — || May 5, 2014 || Mount Lemmon || Mount Lemmon Survey ||  || align=right data-sort-value="0.89" | 890 m || 
|-id=475 bgcolor=#d6d6d6
| 521475 ||  || — || March 24, 2003 || Kitt Peak || Spacewatch ||  || align=right | 3.1 km || 
|-id=476 bgcolor=#d6d6d6
| 521476 ||  || — || March 11, 2013 || Catalina || CSS ||  || align=right | 3.4 km || 
|-id=477 bgcolor=#E9E9E9
| 521477 ||  || — || April 29, 2014 || Haleakala || Pan-STARRS ||  || align=right | 1.6 km || 
|-id=478 bgcolor=#d6d6d6
| 521478 ||  || — || March 27, 2008 || Kitt Peak || Spacewatch ||  || align=right | 2.8 km || 
|-id=479 bgcolor=#d6d6d6
| 521479 ||  || — || October 1, 2010 || Mount Lemmon || Mount Lemmon Survey ||  || align=right | 2.8 km || 
|-id=480 bgcolor=#d6d6d6
| 521480 ||  || — || August 22, 2004 || Kitt Peak || Spacewatch ||  || align=right | 3.2 km || 
|-id=481 bgcolor=#d6d6d6
| 521481 ||  || — || June 15, 2009 || Mount Lemmon || Mount Lemmon Survey ||  || align=right | 3.1 km || 
|-id=482 bgcolor=#E9E9E9
| 521482 ||  || — || August 10, 2007 || Kitt Peak || Spacewatch ||  || align=right data-sort-value="0.94" | 940 m || 
|-id=483 bgcolor=#d6d6d6
| 521483 ||  || — || September 18, 2010 || Mount Lemmon || Mount Lemmon Survey ||  || align=right | 2.5 km || 
|-id=484 bgcolor=#E9E9E9
| 521484 ||  || — || April 30, 2014 || Haleakala || Pan-STARRS ||  || align=right | 1.8 km || 
|-id=485 bgcolor=#d6d6d6
| 521485 ||  || — || September 1, 2005 || Kitt Peak || Spacewatch ||  || align=right | 2.1 km || 
|-id=486 bgcolor=#d6d6d6
| 521486 ||  || — || January 27, 2007 || Kitt Peak || Spacewatch ||  || align=right | 2.6 km || 
|-id=487 bgcolor=#d6d6d6
| 521487 ||  || — || February 7, 2013 || Kitt Peak || Spacewatch ||  || align=right | 3.5 km || 
|-id=488 bgcolor=#E9E9E9
| 521488 ||  || — || April 9, 2010 || Kitt Peak || Spacewatch ||  || align=right | 1.2 km || 
|-id=489 bgcolor=#E9E9E9
| 521489 ||  || — || November 8, 2007 || Mount Lemmon || Mount Lemmon Survey ||  || align=right | 1.7 km || 
|-id=490 bgcolor=#d6d6d6
| 521490 ||  || — || January 6, 2006 || Kitt Peak || Spacewatch ||  || align=right | 2.6 km || 
|-id=491 bgcolor=#E9E9E9
| 521491 ||  || — || March 3, 2009 || Mount Lemmon || Mount Lemmon Survey ||  || align=right | 2.0 km || 
|-id=492 bgcolor=#d6d6d6
| 521492 ||  || — || February 15, 2013 || Haleakala || Pan-STARRS ||  || align=right | 2.6 km || 
|-id=493 bgcolor=#fefefe
| 521493 ||  || — || March 8, 2014 || Mount Lemmon || Mount Lemmon Survey ||  || align=right data-sort-value="0.86" | 860 m || 
|-id=494 bgcolor=#d6d6d6
| 521494 ||  || — || October 19, 2010 || Mount Lemmon || Mount Lemmon Survey ||  || align=right | 2.8 km || 
|-id=495 bgcolor=#d6d6d6
| 521495 ||  || — || February 28, 2008 || Kitt Peak || Spacewatch ||  || align=right | 2.9 km || 
|-id=496 bgcolor=#d6d6d6
| 521496 ||  || — || June 29, 2005 || Kitt Peak || Spacewatch ||  || align=right | 2.2 km || 
|-id=497 bgcolor=#E9E9E9
| 521497 ||  || — || January 16, 2008 || Mount Lemmon || Mount Lemmon Survey ||  || align=right | 2.1 km || 
|-id=498 bgcolor=#fefefe
| 521498 ||  || — || January 26, 2006 || Kitt Peak || Spacewatch ||  || align=right data-sort-value="0.82" | 820 m || 
|-id=499 bgcolor=#E9E9E9
| 521499 ||  || — || April 24, 2014 || Haleakala || Pan-STARRS ||  || align=right | 1.3 km || 
|-id=500 bgcolor=#E9E9E9
| 521500 ||  || — || March 3, 2009 || Kitt Peak || Spacewatch ||  || align=right | 1.2 km || 
|}

521501–521600 

|-bgcolor=#E9E9E9
| 521501 ||  || — || February 8, 2013 || Haleakala || Pan-STARRS ||  || align=right | 1.3 km || 
|-id=502 bgcolor=#d6d6d6
| 521502 ||  || — || January 17, 2007 || Kitt Peak || Spacewatch ||  || align=right | 2.5 km || 
|-id=503 bgcolor=#E9E9E9
| 521503 ||  || — || October 20, 2011 || Mount Lemmon || Mount Lemmon Survey ||  || align=right | 1.8 km || 
|-id=504 bgcolor=#d6d6d6
| 521504 ||  || — || November 13, 2010 || Mount Lemmon || Mount Lemmon Survey ||  || align=right | 2.8 km || 
|-id=505 bgcolor=#d6d6d6
| 521505 ||  || — || August 31, 2005 || Kitt Peak || Spacewatch ||  || align=right | 2.0 km || 
|-id=506 bgcolor=#E9E9E9
| 521506 ||  || — || September 26, 2006 || Kitt Peak || Spacewatch ||  || align=right | 1.9 km || 
|-id=507 bgcolor=#E9E9E9
| 521507 ||  || — || November 6, 2007 || Kitt Peak || Spacewatch ||  || align=right | 1.3 km || 
|-id=508 bgcolor=#fefefe
| 521508 ||  || — || February 26, 2014 || Haleakala || Pan-STARRS ||  || align=right data-sort-value="0.70" | 700 m || 
|-id=509 bgcolor=#E9E9E9
| 521509 ||  || — || February 1, 2009 || Kitt Peak || Spacewatch ||  || align=right | 1.6 km || 
|-id=510 bgcolor=#d6d6d6
| 521510 ||  || — || November 19, 2006 || Kitt Peak || Spacewatch ||  || align=right | 2.1 km || 
|-id=511 bgcolor=#fefefe
| 521511 ||  || — || February 26, 2014 || Haleakala || Pan-STARRS ||  || align=right data-sort-value="0.71" | 710 m || 
|-id=512 bgcolor=#d6d6d6
| 521512 ||  || — || November 6, 2010 || Mount Lemmon || Mount Lemmon Survey ||  || align=right | 2.6 km || 
|-id=513 bgcolor=#d6d6d6
| 521513 ||  || — || January 25, 2007 || Kitt Peak || Spacewatch ||  || align=right | 2.3 km || 
|-id=514 bgcolor=#d6d6d6
| 521514 ||  || — || March 11, 2007 || Kitt Peak || Spacewatch ||  || align=right | 2.7 km || 
|-id=515 bgcolor=#d6d6d6
| 521515 ||  || — || November 6, 2010 || Mount Lemmon || Mount Lemmon Survey || 7:4 || align=right | 3.6 km || 
|-id=516 bgcolor=#E9E9E9
| 521516 ||  || — || October 6, 2011 || Mount Lemmon || Mount Lemmon Survey ||  || align=right | 1.2 km || 
|-id=517 bgcolor=#fefefe
| 521517 ||  || — || November 13, 2012 || Mount Lemmon || Mount Lemmon Survey ||  || align=right data-sort-value="0.77" | 770 m || 
|-id=518 bgcolor=#d6d6d6
| 521518 ||  || — || July 24, 2015 || Haleakala || Pan-STARRS ||  || align=right | 2.5 km || 
|-id=519 bgcolor=#E9E9E9
| 521519 ||  || — || April 8, 2014 || Mount Lemmon || Mount Lemmon Survey ||  || align=right | 1.5 km || 
|-id=520 bgcolor=#E9E9E9
| 521520 ||  || — || August 28, 2006 || Kitt Peak || Spacewatch ||  || align=right | 2.1 km || 
|-id=521 bgcolor=#E9E9E9
| 521521 ||  || — || December 6, 2007 || Kitt Peak || Spacewatch ||  || align=right | 1.9 km || 
|-id=522 bgcolor=#d6d6d6
| 521522 ||  || — || May 23, 2014 || Haleakala || Pan-STARRS ||  || align=right | 2.2 km || 
|-id=523 bgcolor=#d6d6d6
| 521523 ||  || — || October 31, 2010 || Mount Lemmon || Mount Lemmon Survey ||  || align=right | 2.5 km || 
|-id=524 bgcolor=#E9E9E9
| 521524 ||  || — || July 24, 2015 || Haleakala || Pan-STARRS ||  || align=right | 2.1 km || 
|-id=525 bgcolor=#d6d6d6
| 521525 ||  || — || March 13, 2013 || Mount Lemmon || Mount Lemmon Survey ||  || align=right | 2.8 km || 
|-id=526 bgcolor=#fefefe
| 521526 ||  || — || November 7, 2012 || Haleakala || Pan-STARRS ||  || align=right data-sort-value="0.86" | 860 m || 
|-id=527 bgcolor=#d6d6d6
| 521527 ||  || — || June 27, 2014 || Haleakala || Pan-STARRS ||  || align=right | 2.6 km || 
|-id=528 bgcolor=#d6d6d6
| 521528 ||  || — || April 5, 2014 || Haleakala || Pan-STARRS ||  || align=right | 1.7 km || 
|-id=529 bgcolor=#d6d6d6
| 521529 ||  || — || December 12, 2006 || Mount Lemmon || Mount Lemmon Survey ||  || align=right | 2.5 km || 
|-id=530 bgcolor=#d6d6d6
| 521530 ||  || — || December 3, 2005 || Kitt Peak || Spacewatch ||  || align=right | 2.5 km || 
|-id=531 bgcolor=#d6d6d6
| 521531 ||  || — || August 6, 2010 || WISE || WISE ||  || align=right | 2.7 km || 
|-id=532 bgcolor=#d6d6d6
| 521532 ||  || — || September 11, 2010 || Mount Lemmon || Mount Lemmon Survey ||  || align=right | 2.5 km || 
|-id=533 bgcolor=#E9E9E9
| 521533 ||  || — || October 27, 2011 || Mount Lemmon || Mount Lemmon Survey ||  || align=right | 1.5 km || 
|-id=534 bgcolor=#E9E9E9
| 521534 ||  || — || February 3, 2013 || Haleakala || Pan-STARRS ||  || align=right | 1.7 km || 
|-id=535 bgcolor=#d6d6d6
| 521535 ||  || — || September 29, 2010 || Mount Lemmon || Mount Lemmon Survey ||  || align=right | 2.4 km || 
|-id=536 bgcolor=#E9E9E9
| 521536 ||  || — || April 5, 2014 || Haleakala || Pan-STARRS ||  || align=right | 1.4 km || 
|-id=537 bgcolor=#d6d6d6
| 521537 ||  || — || November 4, 2010 || Mount Lemmon || Mount Lemmon Survey ||  || align=right | 2.6 km || 
|-id=538 bgcolor=#d6d6d6
| 521538 ||  || — || February 13, 2008 || Kitt Peak || Spacewatch ||  || align=right | 1.8 km || 
|-id=539 bgcolor=#d6d6d6
| 521539 ||  || — || April 29, 2008 || Mount Lemmon || Mount Lemmon Survey ||  || align=right | 2.3 km || 
|-id=540 bgcolor=#d6d6d6
| 521540 ||  || — || November 13, 2010 || Mount Lemmon || Mount Lemmon Survey ||  || align=right | 2.9 km || 
|-id=541 bgcolor=#d6d6d6
| 521541 ||  || — || November 2, 2010 || Mount Lemmon || Mount Lemmon Survey ||  || align=right | 2.8 km || 
|-id=542 bgcolor=#E9E9E9
| 521542 ||  || — || December 21, 2012 || Mount Lemmon || Mount Lemmon Survey ||  || align=right | 2.1 km || 
|-id=543 bgcolor=#d6d6d6
| 521543 ||  || — || March 4, 2013 || Haleakala || Pan-STARRS ||  || align=right | 3.2 km || 
|-id=544 bgcolor=#d6d6d6
| 521544 ||  || — || July 17, 2010 || WISE || WISE ||  || align=right | 2.8 km || 
|-id=545 bgcolor=#d6d6d6
| 521545 ||  || — || December 29, 2011 || Mount Lemmon || Mount Lemmon Survey ||  || align=right | 2.5 km || 
|-id=546 bgcolor=#d6d6d6
| 521546 ||  || — || November 14, 2010 || Kitt Peak || Spacewatch ||  || align=right | 2.5 km || 
|-id=547 bgcolor=#d6d6d6
| 521547 ||  || — || January 28, 2007 || Kitt Peak || Spacewatch ||  || align=right | 3.0 km || 
|-id=548 bgcolor=#E9E9E9
| 521548 ||  || — || December 31, 2007 || Kitt Peak || Spacewatch ||  || align=right | 2.4 km || 
|-id=549 bgcolor=#E9E9E9
| 521549 ||  || — || July 25, 2015 || Haleakala || Pan-STARRS ||  || align=right | 1.7 km || 
|-id=550 bgcolor=#d6d6d6
| 521550 ||  || — || December 10, 2005 || Kitt Peak || Spacewatch ||  || align=right | 2.7 km || 
|-id=551 bgcolor=#d6d6d6
| 521551 ||  || — || November 30, 2005 || Kitt Peak || Spacewatch ||  || align=right | 2.4 km || 
|-id=552 bgcolor=#E9E9E9
| 521552 ||  || — || December 1, 2011 || Haleakala || Pan-STARRS ||  || align=right | 1.6 km || 
|-id=553 bgcolor=#d6d6d6
| 521553 ||  || — || January 19, 2012 || Haleakala || Pan-STARRS ||  || align=right | 2.7 km || 
|-id=554 bgcolor=#d6d6d6
| 521554 ||  || — || August 22, 2004 || Kitt Peak || Spacewatch ||  || align=right | 2.5 km || 
|-id=555 bgcolor=#E9E9E9
| 521555 ||  || — || November 30, 2011 || Mount Lemmon || Mount Lemmon Survey ||  || align=right | 1.9 km || 
|-id=556 bgcolor=#E9E9E9
| 521556 ||  || — || September 24, 2011 || Haleakala || Pan-STARRS ||  || align=right | 2.0 km || 
|-id=557 bgcolor=#d6d6d6
| 521557 ||  || — || January 29, 2007 || Kitt Peak || Spacewatch ||  || align=right | 2.7 km || 
|-id=558 bgcolor=#d6d6d6
| 521558 ||  || — || April 30, 2014 || Haleakala || Pan-STARRS ||  || align=right | 2.6 km || 
|-id=559 bgcolor=#d6d6d6
| 521559 ||  || — || July 20, 2004 || Siding Spring || SSS ||  || align=right | 2.7 km || 
|-id=560 bgcolor=#d6d6d6
| 521560 ||  || — || October 9, 2004 || Kitt Peak || Spacewatch ||  || align=right | 3.6 km || 
|-id=561 bgcolor=#d6d6d6
| 521561 ||  || — || November 22, 2006 || Kitt Peak || Spacewatch ||  || align=right | 2.1 km || 
|-id=562 bgcolor=#d6d6d6
| 521562 ||  || — || October 24, 2011 || Haleakala || Pan-STARRS ||  || align=right | 3.1 km || 
|-id=563 bgcolor=#d6d6d6
| 521563 ||  || — || April 11, 2008 || Mount Lemmon || Mount Lemmon Survey ||  || align=right | 2.6 km || 
|-id=564 bgcolor=#E9E9E9
| 521564 ||  || — || March 5, 2006 || Kitt Peak || Spacewatch ||  || align=right data-sort-value="0.98" | 980 m || 
|-id=565 bgcolor=#d6d6d6
| 521565 ||  || — || March 11, 2008 || Kitt Peak || Spacewatch ||  || align=right | 2.6 km || 
|-id=566 bgcolor=#d6d6d6
| 521566 ||  || — || February 8, 2008 || Mount Lemmon || Mount Lemmon Survey ||  || align=right | 3.0 km || 
|-id=567 bgcolor=#d6d6d6
| 521567 ||  || — || December 28, 2011 || Kitt Peak || Spacewatch ||  || align=right | 3.3 km || 
|-id=568 bgcolor=#d6d6d6
| 521568 ||  || — || July 28, 2015 || Haleakala || Pan-STARRS ||  || align=right | 3.1 km || 
|-id=569 bgcolor=#d6d6d6
| 521569 ||  || — || March 31, 2008 || Kitt Peak || Spacewatch ||  || align=right | 2.5 km || 
|-id=570 bgcolor=#E9E9E9
| 521570 ||  || — || November 12, 2007 || Mount Lemmon || Mount Lemmon Survey ||  || align=right | 2.3 km || 
|-id=571 bgcolor=#d6d6d6
| 521571 ||  || — || November 5, 2010 || Mount Lemmon || Mount Lemmon Survey ||  || align=right | 3.6 km || 
|-id=572 bgcolor=#fefefe
| 521572 ||  || — || June 11, 2005 || Kitt Peak || Spacewatch ||  || align=right data-sort-value="0.54" | 540 m || 
|-id=573 bgcolor=#fefefe
| 521573 ||  || — || September 19, 2001 || Kitt Peak || Spacewatch ||  || align=right data-sort-value="0.71" | 710 m || 
|-id=574 bgcolor=#fefefe
| 521574 ||  || — || January 31, 2006 || Kitt Peak || Spacewatch ||  || align=right data-sort-value="0.79" | 790 m || 
|-id=575 bgcolor=#fefefe
| 521575 ||  || — || July 29, 2008 || La Sagra || OAM Obs. ||  || align=right data-sort-value="0.62" | 620 m || 
|-id=576 bgcolor=#fefefe
| 521576 ||  || — || March 11, 2014 || Mount Lemmon || Mount Lemmon Survey ||  || align=right data-sort-value="0.83" | 830 m || 
|-id=577 bgcolor=#E9E9E9
| 521577 ||  || — || January 13, 2005 || Kitt Peak || Spacewatch ||  || align=right | 1.0 km || 
|-id=578 bgcolor=#E9E9E9
| 521578 ||  || — || April 1, 2005 || Kitt Peak || Spacewatch ||  || align=right | 2.0 km || 
|-id=579 bgcolor=#E9E9E9
| 521579 ||  || — || October 3, 2003 || Kitt Peak || Spacewatch ||  || align=right | 1.2 km || 
|-id=580 bgcolor=#fefefe
| 521580 ||  || — || May 29, 2011 || Mount Lemmon || Mount Lemmon Survey ||  || align=right | 1.2 km || 
|-id=581 bgcolor=#d6d6d6
| 521581 ||  || — || March 19, 2009 || Kitt Peak || Spacewatch ||  || align=right | 2.6 km || 
|-id=582 bgcolor=#fefefe
| 521582 ||  || — || May 26, 2007 || Mount Lemmon || Mount Lemmon Survey ||  || align=right | 1.0 km || 
|-id=583 bgcolor=#fefefe
| 521583 ||  || — || December 7, 2012 || Mount Lemmon || Mount Lemmon Survey ||  || align=right | 1.1 km || 
|-id=584 bgcolor=#fefefe
| 521584 ||  || — || December 3, 2012 || Mount Lemmon || Mount Lemmon Survey ||  || align=right data-sort-value="0.94" | 940 m || 
|-id=585 bgcolor=#fefefe
| 521585 ||  || — || October 21, 2012 || Haleakala || Pan-STARRS ||  || align=right data-sort-value="0.87" | 870 m || 
|-id=586 bgcolor=#fefefe
| 521586 ||  || — || January 6, 2013 || Kitt Peak || Spacewatch ||  || align=right | 2.0 km || 
|-id=587 bgcolor=#E9E9E9
| 521587 ||  || — || August 4, 2011 || Haleakala || Pan-STARRS ||  || align=right | 1.1 km || 
|-id=588 bgcolor=#E9E9E9
| 521588 ||  || — || October 1, 2003 || Anderson Mesa || LONEOS ||  || align=right data-sort-value="0.96" | 960 m || 
|-id=589 bgcolor=#E9E9E9
| 521589 ||  || — || October 10, 2007 || Mount Lemmon || Mount Lemmon Survey ||  || align=right | 1.5 km || 
|-id=590 bgcolor=#d6d6d6
| 521590 ||  || — || August 12, 2015 || Haleakala || Pan-STARRS ||  || align=right | 2.6 km || 
|-id=591 bgcolor=#E9E9E9
| 521591 ||  || — || November 18, 2003 || Kitt Peak || Spacewatch ||  || align=right | 1.6 km || 
|-id=592 bgcolor=#d6d6d6
| 521592 ||  || — || December 12, 2006 || Kitt Peak || Spacewatch ||  || align=right | 1.9 km || 
|-id=593 bgcolor=#fefefe
| 521593 ||  || — || January 11, 2010 || Kitt Peak || Spacewatch ||  || align=right data-sort-value="0.94" | 940 m || 
|-id=594 bgcolor=#d6d6d6
| 521594 ||  || — || October 22, 2005 || Kitt Peak || Spacewatch ||  || align=right | 3.0 km || 
|-id=595 bgcolor=#d6d6d6
| 521595 ||  || — || October 11, 2010 || Mount Lemmon || Mount Lemmon Survey ||  || align=right | 3.0 km || 
|-id=596 bgcolor=#E9E9E9
| 521596 ||  || — || August 10, 2007 || Kitt Peak || Spacewatch ||  || align=right data-sort-value="0.96" | 960 m || 
|-id=597 bgcolor=#E9E9E9
| 521597 ||  || — || October 22, 2011 || Mount Lemmon || Mount Lemmon Survey ||  || align=right | 2.1 km || 
|-id=598 bgcolor=#d6d6d6
| 521598 ||  || — || December 25, 2006 || Kitt Peak || Spacewatch ||  || align=right | 2.1 km || 
|-id=599 bgcolor=#d6d6d6
| 521599 ||  || — || August 9, 2015 || Haleakala || Pan-STARRS ||  || align=right | 3.1 km || 
|-id=600 bgcolor=#d6d6d6
| 521600 ||  || — || December 27, 2006 || Mount Lemmon || Mount Lemmon Survey ||  || align=right | 2.3 km || 
|}

521601–521700 

|-bgcolor=#d6d6d6
| 521601 ||  || — || March 30, 2008 || Kitt Peak || Spacewatch ||  || align=right | 2.4 km || 
|-id=602 bgcolor=#d6d6d6
| 521602 ||  || — || April 14, 2008 || Kitt Peak || Spacewatch ||  || align=right | 2.7 km || 
|-id=603 bgcolor=#d6d6d6
| 521603 ||  || — || November 12, 2005 || Kitt Peak || Spacewatch ||  || align=right | 2.1 km || 
|-id=604 bgcolor=#d6d6d6
| 521604 ||  || — || September 11, 2004 || Kitt Peak || Spacewatch ||  || align=right | 2.5 km || 
|-id=605 bgcolor=#d6d6d6
| 521605 ||  || — || January 21, 2012 || Kitt Peak || Spacewatch ||  || align=right | 2.7 km || 
|-id=606 bgcolor=#d6d6d6
| 521606 ||  || — || September 18, 2010 || Mount Lemmon || Mount Lemmon Survey ||  || align=right | 2.9 km || 
|-id=607 bgcolor=#fefefe
| 521607 ||  || — || November 7, 2012 || Haleakala || Pan-STARRS ||  || align=right data-sort-value="0.86" | 860 m || 
|-id=608 bgcolor=#E9E9E9
| 521608 ||  || — || August 24, 2011 || Haleakala || Pan-STARRS ||  || align=right | 1.8 km || 
|-id=609 bgcolor=#d6d6d6
| 521609 ||  || — || October 24, 2011 || Haleakala || Pan-STARRS ||  || align=right | 2.9 km || 
|-id=610 bgcolor=#d6d6d6
| 521610 ||  || — || December 16, 2006 || Mount Lemmon || Mount Lemmon Survey ||  || align=right | 2.6 km || 
|-id=611 bgcolor=#d6d6d6
| 521611 ||  || — || February 21, 2007 || Kitt Peak || Spacewatch ||  || align=right | 2.9 km || 
|-id=612 bgcolor=#d6d6d6
| 521612 ||  || — || February 19, 2012 || Kitt Peak || Spacewatch ||  || align=right | 3.3 km || 
|-id=613 bgcolor=#d6d6d6
| 521613 ||  || — || April 5, 2008 || Mount Lemmon || Mount Lemmon Survey ||  || align=right | 2.1 km || 
|-id=614 bgcolor=#E9E9E9
| 521614 ||  || — || October 22, 2006 || Kitt Peak || Spacewatch ||  || align=right | 2.1 km || 
|-id=615 bgcolor=#E9E9E9
| 521615 ||  || — || November 20, 2007 || Kitt Peak || Spacewatch ||  || align=right data-sort-value="0.77" | 770 m || 
|-id=616 bgcolor=#E9E9E9
| 521616 ||  || — || May 7, 2014 || Haleakala || Pan-STARRS ||  || align=right | 1.9 km || 
|-id=617 bgcolor=#d6d6d6
| 521617 ||  || — || February 28, 2008 || Kitt Peak || Spacewatch ||  || align=right | 2.2 km || 
|-id=618 bgcolor=#fefefe
| 521618 ||  || — || August 22, 2011 || La Sagra || OAM Obs. ||  || align=right data-sort-value="0.85" | 850 m || 
|-id=619 bgcolor=#d6d6d6
| 521619 ||  || — || August 12, 2015 || Haleakala || Pan-STARRS ||  || align=right | 2.7 km || 
|-id=620 bgcolor=#d6d6d6
| 521620 ||  || — || August 8, 2010 || WISE || WISE ||  || align=right | 3.7 km || 
|-id=621 bgcolor=#E9E9E9
| 521621 ||  || — || August 12, 2015 || Haleakala || Pan-STARRS ||  || align=right | 1.6 km || 
|-id=622 bgcolor=#d6d6d6
| 521622 ||  || — || August 13, 2015 || Kitt Peak || Spacewatch ||  || align=right | 2.3 km || 
|-id=623 bgcolor=#d6d6d6
| 521623 ||  || — || January 26, 2007 || Kitt Peak || Spacewatch ||  || align=right | 2.5 km || 
|-id=624 bgcolor=#d6d6d6
| 521624 ||  || — || December 13, 2006 || Kitt Peak || Spacewatch ||  || align=right | 2.6 km || 
|-id=625 bgcolor=#E9E9E9
| 521625 ||  || — || October 24, 2011 || Kitt Peak || Spacewatch ||  || align=right | 2.0 km || 
|-id=626 bgcolor=#E9E9E9
| 521626 ||  || — || October 25, 2011 || Haleakala || Pan-STARRS ||  || align=right | 1.6 km || 
|-id=627 bgcolor=#d6d6d6
| 521627 ||  || — || April 30, 2014 || Haleakala || Pan-STARRS ||  || align=right | 2.0 km || 
|-id=628 bgcolor=#d6d6d6
| 521628 ||  || — || August 14, 2015 || Haleakala || Pan-STARRS ||  || align=right | 1.9 km || 
|-id=629 bgcolor=#d6d6d6
| 521629 ||  || — || February 11, 2008 || Mount Lemmon || Mount Lemmon Survey ||  || align=right | 2.2 km || 
|-id=630 bgcolor=#d6d6d6
| 521630 ||  || — || January 27, 2012 || Mount Lemmon || Mount Lemmon Survey ||  || align=right | 2.2 km || 
|-id=631 bgcolor=#fefefe
| 521631 ||  || — || November 7, 2008 || Mount Lemmon || Mount Lemmon Survey ||  || align=right data-sort-value="0.71" | 710 m || 
|-id=632 bgcolor=#d6d6d6
| 521632 ||  || — || March 9, 2007 || Kitt Peak || Spacewatch ||  || align=right | 2.5 km || 
|-id=633 bgcolor=#fefefe
| 521633 ||  || — || January 5, 2006 || Kitt Peak || Spacewatch ||  || align=right | 1.0 km || 
|-id=634 bgcolor=#d6d6d6
| 521634 ||  || — || February 23, 2007 || Kitt Peak || Spacewatch ||  || align=right | 2.5 km || 
|-id=635 bgcolor=#d6d6d6
| 521635 ||  || — || February 20, 2002 || Kitt Peak || Spacewatch ||  || align=right | 2.3 km || 
|-id=636 bgcolor=#d6d6d6
| 521636 ||  || — || May 13, 2008 || Mount Lemmon || Mount Lemmon Survey ||  || align=right | 2.8 km || 
|-id=637 bgcolor=#E9E9E9
| 521637 ||  || — || October 20, 2006 || Kitt Peak || Spacewatch ||  || align=right | 1.6 km || 
|-id=638 bgcolor=#E9E9E9
| 521638 ||  || — || May 9, 2014 || Haleakala || Pan-STARRS ||  || align=right | 1.2 km || 
|-id=639 bgcolor=#d6d6d6
| 521639 ||  || — || January 27, 2007 || Kitt Peak || Spacewatch ||  || align=right | 2.5 km || 
|-id=640 bgcolor=#E9E9E9
| 521640 ||  || — || September 19, 2006 || Kitt Peak || Spacewatch ||  || align=right | 2.2 km || 
|-id=641 bgcolor=#d6d6d6
| 521641 ||  || — || October 12, 2010 || Mount Lemmon || Mount Lemmon Survey ||  || align=right | 2.6 km || 
|-id=642 bgcolor=#d6d6d6
| 521642 ||  || — || March 13, 2007 || Mount Lemmon || Mount Lemmon Survey ||  || align=right | 2.8 km || 
|-id=643 bgcolor=#d6d6d6
| 521643 ||  || — || March 2, 2008 || Kitt Peak || Spacewatch ||  || align=right | 2.0 km || 
|-id=644 bgcolor=#d6d6d6
| 521644 ||  || — || August 30, 2005 || Kitt Peak || Spacewatch ||  || align=right | 2.0 km || 
|-id=645 bgcolor=#d6d6d6
| 521645 ||  || — || January 19, 2012 || Mount Lemmon || Mount Lemmon Survey ||  || align=right | 2.3 km || 
|-id=646 bgcolor=#d6d6d6
| 521646 ||  || — || January 19, 2012 || Kitt Peak || Spacewatch ||  || align=right | 2.7 km || 
|-id=647 bgcolor=#d6d6d6
| 521647 ||  || — || April 4, 2008 || Kitt Peak || Spacewatch ||  || align=right | 2.9 km || 
|-id=648 bgcolor=#d6d6d6
| 521648 ||  || — || January 21, 2012 || Kitt Peak || Spacewatch ||  || align=right | 2.6 km || 
|-id=649 bgcolor=#d6d6d6
| 521649 ||  || — || April 10, 2013 || Haleakala || Pan-STARRS ||  || align=right | 3.7 km || 
|-id=650 bgcolor=#E9E9E9
| 521650 ||  || — || September 19, 2006 || Catalina || CSS ||  || align=right | 2.2 km || 
|-id=651 bgcolor=#E9E9E9
| 521651 ||  || — || May 10, 2014 || Haleakala || Pan-STARRS ||  || align=right | 1.4 km || 
|-id=652 bgcolor=#d6d6d6
| 521652 ||  || — || June 27, 2014 || Haleakala || Pan-STARRS ||  || align=right | 2.7 km || 
|-id=653 bgcolor=#E9E9E9
| 521653 ||  || — || March 25, 2014 || Mount Lemmon || Mount Lemmon Survey ||  || align=right | 1.0 km || 
|-id=654 bgcolor=#E9E9E9
| 521654 ||  || — || October 19, 2011 || Kitt Peak || Spacewatch ||  || align=right | 1.7 km || 
|-id=655 bgcolor=#E9E9E9
| 521655 ||  || — || May 1, 2009 || Kitt Peak || Spacewatch ||  || align=right | 2.4 km || 
|-id=656 bgcolor=#d6d6d6
| 521656 ||  || — || November 1, 2010 || Mount Lemmon || Mount Lemmon Survey ||  || align=right | 2.2 km || 
|-id=657 bgcolor=#fefefe
| 521657 ||  || — || July 26, 2011 || Haleakala || Pan-STARRS ||  || align=right data-sort-value="0.80" | 800 m || 
|-id=658 bgcolor=#fefefe
| 521658 ||  || — || March 16, 2010 || Kitt Peak || Spacewatch ||  || align=right data-sort-value="0.72" | 720 m || 
|-id=659 bgcolor=#fefefe
| 521659 ||  || — || August 4, 2011 || La Sagra || OAM Obs. ||  || align=right | 1.1 km || 
|-id=660 bgcolor=#fefefe
| 521660 ||  || — || February 3, 2013 || Haleakala || Pan-STARRS ||  || align=right data-sort-value="0.95" | 950 m || 
|-id=661 bgcolor=#fefefe
| 521661 ||  || — || July 28, 2011 || Haleakala || Pan-STARRS ||  || align=right data-sort-value="0.80" | 800 m || 
|-id=662 bgcolor=#fefefe
| 521662 ||  || — || November 6, 2008 || Mount Lemmon || Mount Lemmon Survey ||  || align=right data-sort-value="0.81" | 810 m || 
|-id=663 bgcolor=#fefefe
| 521663 ||  || — || August 1, 2011 || Haleakala || Pan-STARRS ||  || align=right | 1.0 km || 
|-id=664 bgcolor=#fefefe
| 521664 ||  || — || April 20, 2014 || Mount Lemmon || Mount Lemmon Survey ||  || align=right | 1.1 km || 
|-id=665 bgcolor=#fefefe
| 521665 ||  || — || October 24, 2008 || Catalina || CSS ||  || align=right data-sort-value="0.84" | 840 m || 
|-id=666 bgcolor=#E9E9E9
| 521666 ||  || — || May 7, 2010 || Mount Lemmon || Mount Lemmon Survey ||  || align=right | 1.1 km || 
|-id=667 bgcolor=#fefefe
| 521667 ||  || — || April 29, 2014 || Kitt Peak || Spacewatch ||  || align=right data-sort-value="0.76" | 760 m || 
|-id=668 bgcolor=#E9E9E9
| 521668 ||  || — || August 12, 2015 || Haleakala || Pan-STARRS ||  || align=right | 2.3 km || 
|-id=669 bgcolor=#fefefe
| 521669 ||  || — || September 23, 2008 || Kitt Peak || Spacewatch ||  || align=right data-sort-value="0.76" | 760 m || 
|-id=670 bgcolor=#fefefe
| 521670 ||  || — || September 17, 2004 || Kitt Peak || Spacewatch ||  || align=right data-sort-value="0.68" | 680 m || 
|-id=671 bgcolor=#E9E9E9
| 521671 ||  || — || February 7, 2008 || Kitt Peak || Spacewatch ||  || align=right | 2.1 km || 
|-id=672 bgcolor=#d6d6d6
| 521672 ||  || — || June 8, 2013 || Mount Lemmon || Mount Lemmon Survey ||  || align=right | 2.4 km || 
|-id=673 bgcolor=#d6d6d6
| 521673 ||  || — || August 15, 2014 || Haleakala || Pan-STARRS ||  || align=right | 2.3 km || 
|-id=674 bgcolor=#E9E9E9
| 521674 ||  || — || October 23, 2011 || Haleakala || Pan-STARRS ||  || align=right | 1.0 km || 
|-id=675 bgcolor=#E9E9E9
| 521675 ||  || — || May 14, 2005 || Mount Lemmon || Mount Lemmon Survey ||  || align=right | 2.1 km || 
|-id=676 bgcolor=#fefefe
| 521676 ||  || — || February 17, 2010 || Kitt Peak || Spacewatch ||  || align=right data-sort-value="0.81" | 810 m || 
|-id=677 bgcolor=#d6d6d6
| 521677 ||  || — || March 15, 2012 || Mount Lemmon || Mount Lemmon Survey ||  || align=right | 2.4 km || 
|-id=678 bgcolor=#E9E9E9
| 521678 ||  || — || September 9, 2015 || Haleakala || Pan-STARRS ||  || align=right | 1.3 km || 
|-id=679 bgcolor=#E9E9E9
| 521679 ||  || — || March 26, 2009 || Kitt Peak || Spacewatch ||  || align=right | 1.7 km || 
|-id=680 bgcolor=#E9E9E9
| 521680 ||  || — || December 28, 2002 || Kitt Peak || Spacewatch ||  || align=right | 3.3 km || 
|-id=681 bgcolor=#E9E9E9
| 521681 ||  || — || September 15, 2006 || Kitt Peak || Spacewatch ||  || align=right | 1.6 km || 
|-id=682 bgcolor=#E9E9E9
| 521682 ||  || — || August 28, 2006 || Kitt Peak || Spacewatch ||  || align=right | 1.3 km || 
|-id=683 bgcolor=#d6d6d6
| 521683 ||  || — || August 27, 2009 || Kitt Peak || Spacewatch ||  || align=right | 3.6 km || 
|-id=684 bgcolor=#d6d6d6
| 521684 ||  || — || February 5, 2013 || Kitt Peak || Spacewatch ||  || align=right | 2.1 km || 
|-id=685 bgcolor=#E9E9E9
| 521685 ||  || — || February 24, 2009 || Kitt Peak || Spacewatch ||  || align=right | 1.4 km || 
|-id=686 bgcolor=#E9E9E9
| 521686 ||  || — || September 4, 2011 || Haleakala || Pan-STARRS ||  || align=right data-sort-value="0.74" | 740 m || 
|-id=687 bgcolor=#d6d6d6
| 521687 ||  || — || February 17, 2001 || Kitt Peak || Spacewatch ||  || align=right | 2.4 km || 
|-id=688 bgcolor=#E9E9E9
| 521688 ||  || — || September 18, 2006 || Kitt Peak || Spacewatch ||  || align=right | 1.7 km || 
|-id=689 bgcolor=#E9E9E9
| 521689 ||  || — || February 7, 2013 || Kitt Peak || Spacewatch ||  || align=right | 2.0 km || 
|-id=690 bgcolor=#d6d6d6
| 521690 ||  || — || March 9, 2007 || Kitt Peak || Spacewatch ||  || align=right | 2.6 km || 
|-id=691 bgcolor=#d6d6d6
| 521691 ||  || — || April 14, 2008 || Kitt Peak || Spacewatch ||  || align=right | 2.9 km || 
|-id=692 bgcolor=#d6d6d6
| 521692 ||  || — || September 18, 2010 || Mount Lemmon || Mount Lemmon Survey ||  || align=right | 2.2 km || 
|-id=693 bgcolor=#d6d6d6
| 521693 ||  || — || February 15, 2013 || Haleakala || Pan-STARRS ||  || align=right | 2.6 km || 
|-id=694 bgcolor=#E9E9E9
| 521694 ||  || — || January 14, 2008 || Kitt Peak || Spacewatch ||  || align=right | 2.1 km || 
|-id=695 bgcolor=#E9E9E9
| 521695 ||  || — || September 15, 2007 || Kitt Peak || Spacewatch ||  || align=right | 1.0 km || 
|-id=696 bgcolor=#d6d6d6
| 521696 ||  || — || March 14, 2007 || Kitt Peak || Spacewatch ||  || align=right | 2.8 km || 
|-id=697 bgcolor=#d6d6d6
| 521697 ||  || — || August 27, 2009 || Kitt Peak || Spacewatch ||  || align=right | 2.6 km || 
|-id=698 bgcolor=#d6d6d6
| 521698 ||  || — || May 3, 2008 || Kitt Peak || Spacewatch ||  || align=right | 2.7 km || 
|-id=699 bgcolor=#d6d6d6
| 521699 ||  || — || March 31, 2008 || Mount Lemmon || Mount Lemmon Survey ||  || align=right | 3.0 km || 
|-id=700 bgcolor=#d6d6d6
| 521700 ||  || — || April 3, 2008 || Mount Lemmon || Mount Lemmon Survey ||  || align=right | 2.8 km || 
|}

521701–521800 

|-bgcolor=#E9E9E9
| 521701 ||  || — || April 24, 2014 || Haleakala || Pan-STARRS ||  || align=right | 1.8 km || 
|-id=702 bgcolor=#d6d6d6
| 521702 ||  || — || April 14, 2008 || Mount Lemmon || Mount Lemmon Survey ||  || align=right | 3.1 km || 
|-id=703 bgcolor=#E9E9E9
| 521703 ||  || — || September 27, 2006 || Mount Lemmon || Mount Lemmon Survey ||  || align=right | 2.2 km || 
|-id=704 bgcolor=#d6d6d6
| 521704 ||  || — || June 29, 2010 || WISE || WISE ||  || align=right | 2.4 km || 
|-id=705 bgcolor=#E9E9E9
| 521705 ||  || — || February 28, 2009 || Kitt Peak || Spacewatch ||  || align=right | 1.4 km || 
|-id=706 bgcolor=#E9E9E9
| 521706 ||  || — || January 10, 2013 || Haleakala || Pan-STARRS ||  || align=right | 1.7 km || 
|-id=707 bgcolor=#d6d6d6
| 521707 ||  || — || February 17, 2013 || Kitt Peak || Spacewatch ||  || align=right | 2.4 km || 
|-id=708 bgcolor=#E9E9E9
| 521708 ||  || — || April 1, 2014 || Kitt Peak || Spacewatch ||  || align=right data-sort-value="0.90" | 900 m || 
|-id=709 bgcolor=#d6d6d6
| 521709 ||  || — || September 14, 2010 || Mount Lemmon || Mount Lemmon Survey ||  || align=right | 2.6 km || 
|-id=710 bgcolor=#d6d6d6
| 521710 ||  || — || August 31, 2005 || Kitt Peak || Spacewatch ||  || align=right | 1.9 km || 
|-id=711 bgcolor=#d6d6d6
| 521711 ||  || — || November 13, 2010 || Mount Lemmon || Mount Lemmon Survey ||  || align=right | 3.3 km || 
|-id=712 bgcolor=#E9E9E9
| 521712 ||  || — || October 2, 2006 || Mount Lemmon || Mount Lemmon Survey ||  || align=right | 1.8 km || 
|-id=713 bgcolor=#E9E9E9
| 521713 ||  || — || September 30, 2006 || Mount Lemmon || Mount Lemmon Survey ||  || align=right | 1.7 km || 
|-id=714 bgcolor=#d6d6d6
| 521714 ||  || — || July 25, 2014 || Haleakala || Pan-STARRS ||  || align=right | 2.3 km || 
|-id=715 bgcolor=#E9E9E9
| 521715 ||  || — || July 25, 2014 || Haleakala || Pan-STARRS ||  || align=right | 1.0 km || 
|-id=716 bgcolor=#d6d6d6
| 521716 ||  || — || June 8, 2013 || Mount Lemmon || Mount Lemmon Survey ||  || align=right | 2.7 km || 
|-id=717 bgcolor=#d6d6d6
| 521717 ||  || — || November 12, 2005 || Kitt Peak || Spacewatch ||  || align=right | 2.2 km || 
|-id=718 bgcolor=#E9E9E9
| 521718 ||  || — || March 18, 2009 || Kitt Peak || Spacewatch ||  || align=right | 1.3 km || 
|-id=719 bgcolor=#E9E9E9
| 521719 ||  || — || September 30, 2010 || Mount Lemmon || Mount Lemmon Survey ||  || align=right | 1.7 km || 
|-id=720 bgcolor=#d6d6d6
| 521720 ||  || — || April 7, 2013 || Mount Lemmon || Mount Lemmon Survey ||  || align=right | 2.3 km || 
|-id=721 bgcolor=#E9E9E9
| 521721 ||  || — || November 19, 2007 || Kitt Peak || Spacewatch ||  || align=right | 1.1 km || 
|-id=722 bgcolor=#d6d6d6
| 521722 ||  || — || January 26, 2012 || Mount Lemmon || Mount Lemmon Survey ||  || align=right | 1.9 km || 
|-id=723 bgcolor=#E9E9E9
| 521723 ||  || — || June 25, 2014 || Mount Lemmon || Mount Lemmon Survey ||  || align=right | 2.2 km || 
|-id=724 bgcolor=#E9E9E9
| 521724 ||  || — || October 28, 2011 || Mount Lemmon || Mount Lemmon Survey ||  || align=right | 1.6 km || 
|-id=725 bgcolor=#E9E9E9
| 521725 ||  || — || August 29, 2006 || Kitt Peak || Spacewatch ||  || align=right | 1.4 km || 
|-id=726 bgcolor=#d6d6d6
| 521726 ||  || — || September 24, 2000 || Kitt Peak || Spacewatch ||  || align=right | 2.2 km || 
|-id=727 bgcolor=#E9E9E9
| 521727 ||  || — || October 2, 2006 || Mount Lemmon || Mount Lemmon Survey ||  || align=right | 1.5 km || 
|-id=728 bgcolor=#d6d6d6
| 521728 ||  || — || December 7, 2005 || Kitt Peak || Spacewatch ||  || align=right | 2.8 km || 
|-id=729 bgcolor=#d6d6d6
| 521729 ||  || — || February 4, 2012 || Haleakala || Pan-STARRS ||  || align=right | 2.8 km || 
|-id=730 bgcolor=#E9E9E9
| 521730 ||  || — || April 2, 2005 || Kitt Peak || Spacewatch ||  || align=right data-sort-value="0.86" | 860 m || 
|-id=731 bgcolor=#d6d6d6
| 521731 ||  || — || March 8, 2013 || Haleakala || Pan-STARRS ||  || align=right | 2.3 km || 
|-id=732 bgcolor=#E9E9E9
| 521732 ||  || — || September 17, 2006 || Kitt Peak || Spacewatch ||  || align=right | 1.8 km || 
|-id=733 bgcolor=#d6d6d6
| 521733 ||  || — || February 24, 2012 || Mount Lemmon || Mount Lemmon Survey || 7:4 || align=right | 2.6 km || 
|-id=734 bgcolor=#E9E9E9
| 521734 ||  || — || September 19, 2006 || Kitt Peak || Spacewatch ||  || align=right | 1.9 km || 
|-id=735 bgcolor=#d6d6d6
| 521735 ||  || — || October 11, 2010 || Mount Lemmon || Mount Lemmon Survey ||  || align=right | 2.3 km || 
|-id=736 bgcolor=#E9E9E9
| 521736 ||  || — || February 28, 2009 || Kitt Peak || Spacewatch ||  || align=right | 1.4 km || 
|-id=737 bgcolor=#d6d6d6
| 521737 ||  || — || October 17, 2010 || Mount Lemmon || Mount Lemmon Survey ||  || align=right | 2.7 km || 
|-id=738 bgcolor=#d6d6d6
| 521738 ||  || — || April 9, 2013 || Haleakala || Pan-STARRS ||  || align=right | 2.1 km || 
|-id=739 bgcolor=#d6d6d6
| 521739 ||  || — || September 2, 2010 || Mount Lemmon || Mount Lemmon Survey ||  || align=right | 2.3 km || 
|-id=740 bgcolor=#d6d6d6
| 521740 ||  || — || January 19, 2012 || Haleakala || Pan-STARRS ||  || align=right | 2.3 km || 
|-id=741 bgcolor=#d6d6d6
| 521741 ||  || — || March 19, 2013 || Haleakala || Pan-STARRS ||  || align=right | 2.4 km || 
|-id=742 bgcolor=#d6d6d6
| 521742 ||  || — || December 13, 2010 || Mount Lemmon || Mount Lemmon Survey ||  || align=right | 2.0 km || 
|-id=743 bgcolor=#E9E9E9
| 521743 ||  || — || October 2, 2006 || Mount Lemmon || Mount Lemmon Survey ||  || align=right | 2.1 km || 
|-id=744 bgcolor=#E9E9E9
| 521744 ||  || — || August 27, 2006 || Kitt Peak || Spacewatch ||  || align=right | 1.4 km || 
|-id=745 bgcolor=#d6d6d6
| 521745 ||  || — || January 19, 2012 || Haleakala || Pan-STARRS ||  || align=right | 2.1 km || 
|-id=746 bgcolor=#d6d6d6
| 521746 ||  || — || October 3, 2005 || Kitt Peak || Spacewatch ||  || align=right | 2.4 km || 
|-id=747 bgcolor=#d6d6d6
| 521747 ||  || — || September 12, 2015 || Haleakala || Pan-STARRS ||  || align=right | 3.1 km || 
|-id=748 bgcolor=#d6d6d6
| 521748 ||  || — || September 16, 2010 || Mount Lemmon || Mount Lemmon Survey ||  || align=right | 3.0 km || 
|-id=749 bgcolor=#d6d6d6
| 521749 ||  || — || April 13, 2013 || Haleakala || Pan-STARRS ||  || align=right | 2.7 km || 
|-id=750 bgcolor=#d6d6d6
| 521750 ||  || — || November 11, 2010 || Mount Lemmon || Mount Lemmon Survey ||  || align=right | 2.1 km || 
|-id=751 bgcolor=#d6d6d6
| 521751 ||  || — || October 28, 2005 || Kitt Peak || Spacewatch ||  || align=right | 2.3 km || 
|-id=752 bgcolor=#d6d6d6
| 521752 ||  || — || December 30, 2005 || Kitt Peak || Spacewatch ||  || align=right | 1.9 km || 
|-id=753 bgcolor=#d6d6d6
| 521753 ||  || — || September 12, 2005 || Kitt Peak || Spacewatch ||  || align=right | 1.8 km || 
|-id=754 bgcolor=#d6d6d6
| 521754 ||  || — || November 13, 2010 || Mount Lemmon || Mount Lemmon Survey ||  || align=right | 2.2 km || 
|-id=755 bgcolor=#d6d6d6
| 521755 ||  || — || October 26, 2005 || Kitt Peak || Spacewatch ||  || align=right | 2.5 km || 
|-id=756 bgcolor=#d6d6d6
| 521756 ||  || — || April 9, 2013 || Haleakala || Pan-STARRS ||  || align=right | 2.9 km || 
|-id=757 bgcolor=#E9E9E9
| 521757 ||  || — || March 12, 2013 || Mount Lemmon || Mount Lemmon Survey ||  || align=right | 1.7 km || 
|-id=758 bgcolor=#d6d6d6
| 521758 ||  || — || October 17, 2010 || Mount Lemmon || Mount Lemmon Survey ||  || align=right | 2.2 km || 
|-id=759 bgcolor=#d6d6d6
| 521759 ||  || — || December 6, 2005 || Kitt Peak || Spacewatch ||  || align=right | 2.5 km || 
|-id=760 bgcolor=#d6d6d6
| 521760 ||  || — || March 10, 2008 || Kitt Peak || Spacewatch ||  || align=right | 2.6 km || 
|-id=761 bgcolor=#d6d6d6
| 521761 ||  || — || January 19, 2012 || Haleakala || Pan-STARRS ||  || align=right | 2.3 km || 
|-id=762 bgcolor=#fefefe
| 521762 ||  || — || April 25, 2014 || Mount Lemmon || Mount Lemmon Survey ||  || align=right data-sort-value="0.67" | 670 m || 
|-id=763 bgcolor=#E9E9E9
| 521763 ||  || — || October 26, 2011 || Haleakala || Pan-STARRS ||  || align=right | 1.6 km || 
|-id=764 bgcolor=#d6d6d6
| 521764 ||  || — || July 8, 2014 || Haleakala || Pan-STARRS ||  || align=right | 2.8 km || 
|-id=765 bgcolor=#d6d6d6
| 521765 ||  || — || June 27, 2014 || Haleakala || Pan-STARRS ||  || align=right | 2.1 km || 
|-id=766 bgcolor=#d6d6d6
| 521766 ||  || — || August 27, 2009 || Kitt Peak || Spacewatch ||  || align=right | 2.5 km || 
|-id=767 bgcolor=#E9E9E9
| 521767 ||  || — || June 18, 2010 || Mount Lemmon || Mount Lemmon Survey ||  || align=right | 1.6 km || 
|-id=768 bgcolor=#fefefe
| 521768 ||  || — || April 22, 2004 || Kitt Peak || Spacewatch ||  || align=right data-sort-value="0.71" | 710 m || 
|-id=769 bgcolor=#fefefe
| 521769 ||  || — || April 21, 2014 || Mount Lemmon || Mount Lemmon Survey ||  || align=right data-sort-value="0.99" | 990 m || 
|-id=770 bgcolor=#E9E9E9
| 521770 ||  || — || December 5, 2007 || Mount Lemmon || Mount Lemmon Survey ||  || align=right data-sort-value="0.90" | 900 m || 
|-id=771 bgcolor=#E9E9E9
| 521771 ||  || — || November 7, 2007 || Catalina || CSS ||  || align=right | 1.2 km || 
|-id=772 bgcolor=#d6d6d6
| 521772 ||  || — || March 13, 2013 || Kitt Peak || Spacewatch ||  || align=right | 2.6 km || 
|-id=773 bgcolor=#E9E9E9
| 521773 ||  || — || March 19, 2009 || Kitt Peak || Spacewatch ||  || align=right | 2.3 km || 
|-id=774 bgcolor=#d6d6d6
| 521774 ||  || — || October 11, 2010 || Kitt Peak || Spacewatch ||  || align=right | 2.0 km || 
|-id=775 bgcolor=#d6d6d6
| 521775 ||  || — || February 23, 2012 || Mount Lemmon || Mount Lemmon Survey ||  || align=right | 1.9 km || 
|-id=776 bgcolor=#d6d6d6
| 521776 ||  || — || March 12, 2007 || Mount Lemmon || Mount Lemmon Survey ||  || align=right | 2.7 km || 
|-id=777 bgcolor=#d6d6d6
| 521777 ||  || — || November 8, 2010 || Kitt Peak || Spacewatch ||  || align=right | 2.9 km || 
|-id=778 bgcolor=#E9E9E9
| 521778 ||  || — || April 5, 2014 || Haleakala || Pan-STARRS ||  || align=right | 1.1 km || 
|-id=779 bgcolor=#d6d6d6
| 521779 ||  || — || February 28, 2012 || Haleakala || Pan-STARRS ||  || align=right | 2.4 km || 
|-id=780 bgcolor=#d6d6d6
| 521780 ||  || — || April 3, 2008 || Mount Lemmon || Mount Lemmon Survey ||  || align=right | 2.5 km || 
|-id=781 bgcolor=#d6d6d6
| 521781 ||  || — || October 12, 2010 || Catalina || CSS ||  || align=right | 2.4 km || 
|-id=782 bgcolor=#E9E9E9
| 521782 ||  || — || November 18, 2011 || Kitt Peak || Spacewatch ||  || align=right | 2.7 km || 
|-id=783 bgcolor=#E9E9E9
| 521783 ||  || — || November 14, 2010 || Mount Lemmon || Mount Lemmon Survey ||  || align=right | 2.2 km || 
|-id=784 bgcolor=#d6d6d6
| 521784 ||  || — || April 3, 2008 || Kitt Peak || Spacewatch ||  || align=right | 2.7 km || 
|-id=785 bgcolor=#d6d6d6
| 521785 ||  || — || June 4, 2014 || Haleakala || Pan-STARRS ||  || align=right | 2.5 km || 
|-id=786 bgcolor=#d6d6d6
| 521786 ||  || — || December 5, 2010 || Mount Lemmon || Mount Lemmon Survey ||  || align=right | 2.5 km || 
|-id=787 bgcolor=#d6d6d6
| 521787 ||  || — || March 1, 2012 || Mount Lemmon || Mount Lemmon Survey ||  || align=right | 2.4 km || 
|-id=788 bgcolor=#d6d6d6
| 521788 ||  || — || April 6, 2008 || Kitt Peak || Spacewatch ||  || align=right | 2.7 km || 
|-id=789 bgcolor=#E9E9E9
| 521789 ||  || — || November 15, 2006 || Mount Lemmon || Mount Lemmon Survey ||  || align=right | 2.5 km || 
|-id=790 bgcolor=#d6d6d6
| 521790 ||  || — || November 3, 2010 || Kitt Peak || Spacewatch ||  || align=right | 2.9 km || 
|-id=791 bgcolor=#d6d6d6
| 521791 ||  || — || December 10, 2005 || Kitt Peak || Spacewatch ||  || align=right | 2.1 km || 
|-id=792 bgcolor=#d6d6d6
| 521792 ||  || — || May 7, 2014 || Haleakala || Pan-STARRS ||  || align=right | 2.9 km || 
|-id=793 bgcolor=#d6d6d6
| 521793 ||  || — || October 31, 2010 || Mount Lemmon || Mount Lemmon Survey ||  || align=right | 2.6 km || 
|-id=794 bgcolor=#E9E9E9
| 521794 ||  || — || February 19, 2009 || Kitt Peak || Spacewatch ||  || align=right | 1.4 km || 
|-id=795 bgcolor=#d6d6d6
| 521795 ||  || — || February 27, 2012 || Haleakala || Pan-STARRS ||  || align=right | 3.1 km || 
|-id=796 bgcolor=#fefefe
| 521796 ||  || — || February 4, 2006 || Mount Lemmon || Mount Lemmon Survey ||  || align=right data-sort-value="0.75" | 750 m || 
|-id=797 bgcolor=#fefefe
| 521797 ||  || — || April 3, 2008 || Kitt Peak || Spacewatch ||  || align=right data-sort-value="0.57" | 570 m || 
|-id=798 bgcolor=#E9E9E9
| 521798 ||  || — || May 3, 2014 || Kitt Peak || Spacewatch ||  || align=right | 1.0 km || 
|-id=799 bgcolor=#E9E9E9
| 521799 ||  || — || April 13, 2010 || WISE || WISE ||  || align=right | 1.8 km || 
|-id=800 bgcolor=#d6d6d6
| 521800 ||  || — || December 10, 2010 || Mount Lemmon || Mount Lemmon Survey ||  || align=right | 2.8 km || 
|}

521801–521900 

|-bgcolor=#d6d6d6
| 521801 ||  || — || September 28, 2009 || Mount Lemmon || Mount Lemmon Survey ||  || align=right | 2.9 km || 
|-id=802 bgcolor=#E9E9E9
| 521802 ||  || — || October 2, 2006 || Mount Lemmon || Mount Lemmon Survey ||  || align=right | 1.4 km || 
|-id=803 bgcolor=#d6d6d6
| 521803 ||  || — || January 30, 2011 || Kitt Peak || Spacewatch ||  || align=right | 3.1 km || 
|-id=804 bgcolor=#d6d6d6
| 521804 ||  || — || October 8, 2015 || Haleakala || Pan-STARRS || TEL || align=right | 1.0 km || 
|-id=805 bgcolor=#d6d6d6
| 521805 ||  || — || May 12, 2013 || Haleakala || Pan-STARRS || TEL || align=right | 1.2 km || 
|-id=806 bgcolor=#d6d6d6
| 521806 ||  || — || March 15, 2007 || Mount Lemmon || Mount Lemmon Survey ||  || align=right | 2.5 km || 
|-id=807 bgcolor=#E9E9E9
| 521807 ||  || — || May 10, 2014 || Mount Lemmon || Mount Lemmon Survey ||  || align=right data-sort-value="0.83" | 830 m || 
|-id=808 bgcolor=#d6d6d6
| 521808 ||  || — || October 8, 2015 || Haleakala || Pan-STARRS ||  || align=right | 2.5 km || 
|-id=809 bgcolor=#d6d6d6
| 521809 ||  || — || December 6, 2010 || Kitt Peak || Spacewatch ||  || align=right | 2.9 km || 
|-id=810 bgcolor=#d6d6d6
| 521810 ||  || — || August 12, 2015 || Haleakala || Pan-STARRS ||  || align=right | 2.5 km || 
|-id=811 bgcolor=#fefefe
| 521811 ||  || — || September 27, 2012 || Haleakala || Pan-STARRS ||  || align=right data-sort-value="0.93" | 930 m || 
|-id=812 bgcolor=#fefefe
| 521812 ||  || — || January 2, 2009 || Kitt Peak || Spacewatch || NYS || align=right data-sort-value="0.61" | 610 m || 
|-id=813 bgcolor=#E9E9E9
| 521813 ||  || — || June 2, 2014 || Haleakala || Pan-STARRS || EUN || align=right data-sort-value="0.96" | 960 m || 
|-id=814 bgcolor=#E9E9E9
| 521814 ||  || — || January 30, 2008 || Mount Lemmon || Mount Lemmon Survey ||  || align=right | 1.8 km || 
|-id=815 bgcolor=#fefefe
| 521815 ||  || — || March 20, 2010 || Kitt Peak || Spacewatch ||  || align=right | 1.0 km || 
|-id=816 bgcolor=#fefefe
| 521816 ||  || — || February 28, 2014 || Haleakala || Pan-STARRS ||  || align=right data-sort-value="0.88" | 880 m || 
|-id=817 bgcolor=#fefefe
| 521817 ||  || — || May 25, 2007 || Mount Lemmon || Mount Lemmon Survey ||  || align=right data-sort-value="0.90" | 900 m || 
|-id=818 bgcolor=#d6d6d6
| 521818 ||  || — || December 29, 2005 || Kitt Peak || Spacewatch ||  || align=right | 3.4 km || 
|-id=819 bgcolor=#d6d6d6
| 521819 ||  || — || May 6, 2008 || Mount Lemmon || Mount Lemmon Survey ||  || align=right | 3.2 km || 
|-id=820 bgcolor=#d6d6d6
| 521820 ||  || — || March 28, 2008 || Mount Lemmon || Mount Lemmon Survey ||  || align=right | 2.1 km || 
|-id=821 bgcolor=#d6d6d6
| 521821 ||  || — || December 2, 2010 || Kitt Peak || Spacewatch ||  || align=right | 3.5 km || 
|-id=822 bgcolor=#d6d6d6
| 521822 ||  || — || March 15, 2012 || Mount Lemmon || Mount Lemmon Survey ||  || align=right | 2.7 km || 
|-id=823 bgcolor=#E9E9E9
| 521823 ||  || — || January 19, 2008 || Mount Lemmon || Mount Lemmon Survey ||  || align=right | 2.2 km || 
|-id=824 bgcolor=#E9E9E9
| 521824 ||  || — || October 9, 2007 || Mount Lemmon || Mount Lemmon Survey ||  || align=right data-sort-value="0.90" | 900 m || 
|-id=825 bgcolor=#E9E9E9
| 521825 ||  || — || September 9, 2015 || Haleakala || Pan-STARRS ||  || align=right data-sort-value="0.74" | 740 m || 
|-id=826 bgcolor=#d6d6d6
| 521826 ||  || — || February 26, 2012 || Mount Lemmon || Mount Lemmon Survey ||  || align=right | 2.8 km || 
|-id=827 bgcolor=#E9E9E9
| 521827 ||  || — || March 17, 2009 || Kitt Peak || Spacewatch ||  || align=right | 1.3 km || 
|-id=828 bgcolor=#d6d6d6
| 521828 ||  || — || April 23, 2007 || Mount Lemmon || Mount Lemmon Survey ||  || align=right | 2.7 km || 
|-id=829 bgcolor=#E9E9E9
| 521829 ||  || — || November 13, 2006 || Kitt Peak || Spacewatch ||  || align=right | 2.1 km || 
|-id=830 bgcolor=#d6d6d6
| 521830 ||  || — || August 28, 2014 || Haleakala || Pan-STARRS ||  || align=right | 2.7 km || 
|-id=831 bgcolor=#E9E9E9
| 521831 ||  || — || October 26, 2011 || Haleakala || Pan-STARRS ||  || align=right | 1.0 km || 
|-id=832 bgcolor=#d6d6d6
| 521832 ||  || — || August 20, 2014 || Haleakala || Pan-STARRS ||  || align=right | 2.6 km || 
|-id=833 bgcolor=#E9E9E9
| 521833 ||  || — || April 10, 2013 || Haleakala || Pan-STARRS ||  || align=right | 1.9 km || 
|-id=834 bgcolor=#E9E9E9
| 521834 ||  || — || January 11, 2008 || Mount Lemmon || Mount Lemmon Survey ||  || align=right | 1.5 km || 
|-id=835 bgcolor=#E9E9E9
| 521835 ||  || — || May 8, 2014 || Haleakala || Pan-STARRS ||  || align=right | 2.1 km || 
|-id=836 bgcolor=#d6d6d6
| 521836 ||  || — || October 13, 2010 || Mount Lemmon || Mount Lemmon Survey ||  || align=right | 2.4 km || 
|-id=837 bgcolor=#d6d6d6
| 521837 ||  || — || November 1, 2010 || Kitt Peak || Spacewatch ||  || align=right | 1.9 km || 
|-id=838 bgcolor=#d6d6d6
| 521838 ||  || — || January 8, 2011 || Mount Lemmon || Mount Lemmon Survey ||  || align=right | 2.1 km || 
|-id=839 bgcolor=#E9E9E9
| 521839 ||  || — || September 11, 2010 || La Sagra || OAM Obs. ||  || align=right | 2.0 km || 
|-id=840 bgcolor=#d6d6d6
| 521840 ||  || — || November 14, 2010 || Kitt Peak || Spacewatch ||  || align=right | 2.4 km || 
|-id=841 bgcolor=#d6d6d6
| 521841 ||  || — || April 19, 2007 || Kitt Peak || Spacewatch ||  || align=right | 2.5 km || 
|-id=842 bgcolor=#d6d6d6
| 521842 ||  || — || September 23, 2009 || Mount Lemmon || Mount Lemmon Survey ||  || align=right | 2.9 km || 
|-id=843 bgcolor=#d6d6d6
| 521843 ||  || — || February 23, 2007 || Mount Lemmon || Mount Lemmon Survey ||  || align=right | 2.0 km || 
|-id=844 bgcolor=#d6d6d6
| 521844 ||  || — || December 5, 2010 || Mount Lemmon || Mount Lemmon Survey ||  || align=right | 2.5 km || 
|-id=845 bgcolor=#E9E9E9
| 521845 ||  || — || April 15, 2013 || Haleakala || Pan-STARRS ||  || align=right data-sort-value="0.82" | 820 m || 
|-id=846 bgcolor=#E9E9E9
| 521846 ||  || — || September 26, 2006 || Kitt Peak || Spacewatch ||  || align=right | 1.4 km || 
|-id=847 bgcolor=#d6d6d6
| 521847 ||  || — || January 23, 2011 || Mount Lemmon || Mount Lemmon Survey || critical || align=right | 2.1 km || 
|-id=848 bgcolor=#d6d6d6
| 521848 ||  || — || January 14, 2011 || Mount Lemmon || Mount Lemmon Survey ||  || align=right | 2.6 km || 
|-id=849 bgcolor=#fefefe
| 521849 ||  || — || February 8, 2013 || Haleakala || Pan-STARRS ||  || align=right data-sort-value="0.71" | 710 m || 
|-id=850 bgcolor=#d6d6d6
| 521850 ||  || — || July 4, 2014 || Haleakala || Pan-STARRS ||  || align=right | 2.3 km || 
|-id=851 bgcolor=#d6d6d6
| 521851 ||  || — || August 3, 2014 || Haleakala || Pan-STARRS ||  || align=right | 3.4 km || 
|-id=852 bgcolor=#E9E9E9
| 521852 ||  || — || March 10, 2008 || Kitt Peak || Spacewatch ||  || align=right | 1.4 km || 
|-id=853 bgcolor=#d6d6d6
| 521853 ||  || — || February 5, 2011 || Mount Lemmon || Mount Lemmon Survey ||  || align=right | 2.9 km || 
|-id=854 bgcolor=#d6d6d6
| 521854 ||  || — || October 8, 2015 || Haleakala || Pan-STARRS ||  || align=right | 2.5 km || 
|-id=855 bgcolor=#d6d6d6
| 521855 ||  || — || August 26, 2014 || Haleakala || Pan-STARRS ||  || align=right | 2.9 km || 
|-id=856 bgcolor=#fefefe
| 521856 ||  || — || January 30, 2006 || Kitt Peak || Spacewatch ||  || align=right data-sort-value="0.59" | 590 m || 
|-id=857 bgcolor=#E9E9E9
| 521857 ||  || — || February 3, 2013 || Haleakala || Pan-STARRS ||  || align=right | 1.9 km || 
|-id=858 bgcolor=#E9E9E9
| 521858 ||  || — || April 10, 2013 || Haleakala || Pan-STARRS ||  || align=right | 1.6 km || 
|-id=859 bgcolor=#E9E9E9
| 521859 ||  || — || January 30, 2008 || Kitt Peak || Spacewatch ||  || align=right | 2.0 km || 
|-id=860 bgcolor=#d6d6d6
| 521860 ||  || — || December 2, 2010 || Kitt Peak || Spacewatch ||  || align=right | 3.1 km || 
|-id=861 bgcolor=#d6d6d6
| 521861 ||  || — || September 24, 2009 || Kitt Peak || Spacewatch ||  || align=right | 2.3 km || 
|-id=862 bgcolor=#d6d6d6
| 521862 ||  || — || August 4, 2014 || Haleakala || Pan-STARRS ||  || align=right | 2.3 km || 
|-id=863 bgcolor=#d6d6d6
| 521863 ||  || — || March 31, 2012 || Kitt Peak || Spacewatch ||  || align=right | 2.6 km || 
|-id=864 bgcolor=#fefefe
| 521864 ||  || — || March 19, 2010 || Mount Lemmon || Mount Lemmon Survey ||  || align=right data-sort-value="0.75" | 750 m || 
|-id=865 bgcolor=#fefefe
| 521865 ||  || — || October 8, 2004 || Kitt Peak || Spacewatch ||  || align=right data-sort-value="0.94" | 940 m || 
|-id=866 bgcolor=#d6d6d6
| 521866 ||  || — || April 22, 2007 || Kitt Peak || Spacewatch ||  || align=right | 2.9 km || 
|-id=867 bgcolor=#E9E9E9
| 521867 ||  || — || October 23, 2011 || Kitt Peak || Spacewatch ||  || align=right | 1.2 km || 
|-id=868 bgcolor=#d6d6d6
| 521868 ||  || — || January 30, 2006 || Kitt Peak || Spacewatch ||  || align=right | 2.2 km || 
|-id=869 bgcolor=#d6d6d6
| 521869 ||  || — || August 28, 2005 || Kitt Peak || Spacewatch ||  || align=right | 1.9 km || 
|-id=870 bgcolor=#d6d6d6
| 521870 ||  || — || October 7, 2004 || Kitt Peak || Spacewatch ||  || align=right | 2.7 km || 
|-id=871 bgcolor=#d6d6d6
| 521871 ||  || — || August 27, 2009 || Kitt Peak || Spacewatch || critical || align=right | 2.3 km || 
|-id=872 bgcolor=#d6d6d6
| 521872 ||  || — || September 15, 2009 || Kitt Peak || Spacewatch ||  || align=right | 3.4 km || 
|-id=873 bgcolor=#d6d6d6
| 521873 ||  || — || November 30, 2005 || Kitt Peak || Spacewatch ||  || align=right | 1.9 km || 
|-id=874 bgcolor=#E9E9E9
| 521874 ||  || — || November 10, 2006 || Kitt Peak || Spacewatch ||  || align=right | 1.8 km || 
|-id=875 bgcolor=#E9E9E9
| 521875 ||  || — || October 19, 2011 || Kitt Peak || Spacewatch ||  || align=right | 1.6 km || 
|-id=876 bgcolor=#E9E9E9
| 521876 ||  || — || September 15, 2010 || Mount Lemmon || Mount Lemmon Survey ||  || align=right | 2.2 km || 
|-id=877 bgcolor=#d6d6d6
| 521877 ||  || — || December 1, 2010 || Kitt Peak || Spacewatch ||  || align=right | 3.2 km || 
|-id=878 bgcolor=#E9E9E9
| 521878 ||  || — || August 28, 2006 || Kitt Peak || Spacewatch ||  || align=right | 1.1 km || 
|-id=879 bgcolor=#d6d6d6
| 521879 ||  || — || October 10, 2015 || Haleakala || Pan-STARRS ||  || align=right | 2.4 km || 
|-id=880 bgcolor=#d6d6d6
| 521880 ||  || — || October 15, 2004 || Kitt Peak || Spacewatch ||  || align=right | 2.9 km || 
|-id=881 bgcolor=#E9E9E9
| 521881 ||  || — || October 25, 2011 || Haleakala || Pan-STARRS ||  || align=right | 1.1 km || 
|-id=882 bgcolor=#E9E9E9
| 521882 ||  || — || April 26, 2009 || Kitt Peak || Spacewatch ||  || align=right | 2.4 km || 
|-id=883 bgcolor=#d6d6d6
| 521883 ||  || — || November 1, 2010 || Kitt Peak || Spacewatch ||  || align=right | 2.6 km || 
|-id=884 bgcolor=#d6d6d6
| 521884 ||  || — || May 8, 2013 || Haleakala || Pan-STARRS ||  || align=right | 2.3 km || 
|-id=885 bgcolor=#d6d6d6
| 521885 ||  || — || April 6, 2013 || Mount Lemmon || Mount Lemmon Survey ||  || align=right | 2.9 km || 
|-id=886 bgcolor=#d6d6d6
| 521886 ||  || — || June 7, 2013 || Haleakala || Pan-STARRS ||  || align=right | 2.7 km || 
|-id=887 bgcolor=#d6d6d6
| 521887 ||  || — || April 15, 2013 || Haleakala || Pan-STARRS ||  || align=right | 2.9 km || 
|-id=888 bgcolor=#d6d6d6
| 521888 ||  || — || September 30, 2010 || Mount Lemmon || Mount Lemmon Survey ||  || align=right | 2.2 km || 
|-id=889 bgcolor=#d6d6d6
| 521889 ||  || — || October 16, 2009 || Mount Lemmon || Mount Lemmon Survey ||  || align=right | 2.3 km || 
|-id=890 bgcolor=#E9E9E9
| 521890 ||  || — || October 22, 2006 || Kitt Peak || Spacewatch ||  || align=right | 1.6 km || 
|-id=891 bgcolor=#d6d6d6
| 521891 ||  || — || April 14, 2008 || Kitt Peak || Spacewatch ||  || align=right | 2.4 km || 
|-id=892 bgcolor=#E9E9E9
| 521892 ||  || — || July 26, 2014 || Haleakala || Pan-STARRS ||  || align=right | 2.1 km || 
|-id=893 bgcolor=#d6d6d6
| 521893 ||  || — || October 9, 2010 || Mount Lemmon || Mount Lemmon Survey ||  || align=right | 1.5 km || 
|-id=894 bgcolor=#d6d6d6
| 521894 ||  || — || October 30, 2010 || Mount Lemmon || Mount Lemmon Survey ||  || align=right | 2.0 km || 
|-id=895 bgcolor=#d6d6d6
| 521895 ||  || — || January 19, 2012 || Haleakala || Pan-STARRS ||  || align=right | 2.6 km || 
|-id=896 bgcolor=#d6d6d6
| 521896 ||  || — || April 8, 2008 || Kitt Peak || Spacewatch ||  || align=right | 2.5 km || 
|-id=897 bgcolor=#d6d6d6
| 521897 ||  || — || November 2, 2010 || Kitt Peak || Spacewatch ||  || align=right | 2.7 km || 
|-id=898 bgcolor=#d6d6d6
| 521898 ||  || — || March 3, 2006 || Catalina || CSS ||  || align=right | 3.3 km || 
|-id=899 bgcolor=#E9E9E9
| 521899 ||  || — || January 27, 2012 || Mount Lemmon || Mount Lemmon Survey ||  || align=right | 1.4 km || 
|-id=900 bgcolor=#E9E9E9
| 521900 ||  || — || May 11, 2010 || Mount Lemmon || Mount Lemmon Survey ||  || align=right data-sort-value="0.82" | 820 m || 
|}

521901–522000 

|-bgcolor=#E9E9E9
| 521901 ||  || — || November 15, 2011 || Mount Lemmon || Mount Lemmon Survey ||  || align=right | 1.4 km || 
|-id=902 bgcolor=#d6d6d6
| 521902 ||  || — || February 1, 2012 || Mount Lemmon || Mount Lemmon Survey ||  || align=right | 2.9 km || 
|-id=903 bgcolor=#d6d6d6
| 521903 ||  || — || December 6, 2010 || Mount Lemmon || Mount Lemmon Survey ||  || align=right | 3.6 km || 
|-id=904 bgcolor=#E9E9E9
| 521904 ||  || — || October 26, 2011 || Haleakala || Pan-STARRS ||  || align=right data-sort-value="0.88" | 880 m || 
|-id=905 bgcolor=#d6d6d6
| 521905 ||  || — || February 23, 2012 || Catalina || CSS ||  || align=right | 3.4 km || 
|-id=906 bgcolor=#d6d6d6
| 521906 ||  || — || July 30, 2014 || Haleakala || Pan-STARRS ||  || align=right | 2.0 km || 
|-id=907 bgcolor=#E9E9E9
| 521907 ||  || — || November 16, 2006 || Kitt Peak || Spacewatch ||  || align=right | 1.5 km || 
|-id=908 bgcolor=#d6d6d6
| 521908 ||  || — || October 30, 2010 || Mount Lemmon || Mount Lemmon Survey ||  || align=right | 2.1 km || 
|-id=909 bgcolor=#d6d6d6
| 521909 ||  || — || June 25, 2014 || Mount Lemmon || Mount Lemmon Survey ||  || align=right | 2.4 km || 
|-id=910 bgcolor=#d6d6d6
| 521910 ||  || — || March 23, 2013 || Mount Lemmon || Mount Lemmon Survey ||  || align=right | 2.1 km || 
|-id=911 bgcolor=#E9E9E9
| 521911 ||  || — || October 2, 2006 || Mount Lemmon || Mount Lemmon Survey ||  || align=right | 2.4 km || 
|-id=912 bgcolor=#fefefe
| 521912 ||  || — || March 7, 2014 || Kitt Peak || Spacewatch ||  || align=right data-sort-value="0.86" | 860 m || 
|-id=913 bgcolor=#fefefe
| 521913 ||  || — || February 28, 2014 || Haleakala || Pan-STARRS ||  || align=right data-sort-value="0.78" | 780 m || 
|-id=914 bgcolor=#E9E9E9
| 521914 ||  || — || August 12, 2015 || Haleakala || Pan-STARRS ||  || align=right | 2.1 km || 
|-id=915 bgcolor=#E9E9E9
| 521915 ||  || — || July 25, 2014 || Haleakala || Pan-STARRS ||  || align=right | 1.9 km || 
|-id=916 bgcolor=#d6d6d6
| 521916 ||  || — || December 22, 2005 || Kitt Peak || Spacewatch ||  || align=right | 2.7 km || 
|-id=917 bgcolor=#fefefe
| 521917 ||  || — || August 29, 2011 || La Sagra || OAM Obs. ||  || align=right data-sort-value="0.75" | 750 m || 
|-id=918 bgcolor=#d6d6d6
| 521918 ||  || — || March 24, 2012 || Mount Lemmon || Mount Lemmon Survey ||  || align=right | 2.1 km || 
|-id=919 bgcolor=#d6d6d6
| 521919 ||  || — || January 26, 2012 || Mount Lemmon || Mount Lemmon Survey ||  || align=right | 1.9 km || 
|-id=920 bgcolor=#fefefe
| 521920 ||  || — || May 30, 2015 || Haleakala || Pan-STARRS ||  || align=right data-sort-value="0.98" | 980 m || 
|-id=921 bgcolor=#E9E9E9
| 521921 ||  || — || November 18, 2011 || Mount Lemmon || Mount Lemmon Survey ||  || align=right | 1.7 km || 
|-id=922 bgcolor=#fefefe
| 521922 ||  || — || August 11, 2004 || Campo Imperatore || CINEOS ||  || align=right data-sort-value="0.82" | 820 m || 
|-id=923 bgcolor=#fefefe
| 521923 ||  || — || November 20, 2004 || Kitt Peak || Spacewatch ||  || align=right data-sort-value="0.90" | 900 m || 
|-id=924 bgcolor=#fefefe
| 521924 ||  || — || March 2, 2006 || Mount Lemmon || Mount Lemmon Survey ||  || align=right data-sort-value="0.98" | 980 m || 
|-id=925 bgcolor=#E9E9E9
| 521925 ||  || — || September 15, 2006 || Kitt Peak || Spacewatch ||  || align=right | 1.6 km || 
|-id=926 bgcolor=#E9E9E9
| 521926 ||  || — || October 3, 2006 || Mount Lemmon || Mount Lemmon Survey ||  || align=right | 1.4 km || 
|-id=927 bgcolor=#E9E9E9
| 521927 ||  || — || July 1, 2014 || Haleakala || Pan-STARRS ||  || align=right data-sort-value="0.82" | 820 m || 
|-id=928 bgcolor=#d6d6d6
| 521928 ||  || — || September 12, 2009 || Kitt Peak || Spacewatch ||  || align=right | 2.3 km || 
|-id=929 bgcolor=#E9E9E9
| 521929 ||  || — || October 26, 2011 || Haleakala || Pan-STARRS ||  || align=right | 1.3 km || 
|-id=930 bgcolor=#E9E9E9
| 521930 ||  || — || September 28, 2006 || Kitt Peak || Spacewatch ||  || align=right | 1.9 km || 
|-id=931 bgcolor=#d6d6d6
| 521931 ||  || — || May 12, 2007 || Kitt Peak || Spacewatch ||  || align=right | 2.9 km || 
|-id=932 bgcolor=#E9E9E9
| 521932 ||  || — || June 24, 2014 || Mount Lemmon || Mount Lemmon Survey ||  || align=right | 1.1 km || 
|-id=933 bgcolor=#d6d6d6
| 521933 ||  || — || September 13, 2007 || Mount Lemmon || Mount Lemmon Survey || 7:4 || align=right | 3.3 km || 
|-id=934 bgcolor=#d6d6d6
| 521934 ||  || — || July 28, 2014 || Haleakala || Pan-STARRS ||  || align=right | 3.2 km || 
|-id=935 bgcolor=#E9E9E9
| 521935 ||  || — || September 12, 2005 || Kitt Peak || Spacewatch ||  || align=right | 2.5 km || 
|-id=936 bgcolor=#d6d6d6
| 521936 ||  || — || September 15, 2009 || Kitt Peak || Spacewatch ||  || align=right | 3.1 km || 
|-id=937 bgcolor=#FA8072
| 521937 ||  || — || September 8, 2004 || Socorro || LINEAR ||  || align=right data-sort-value="0.90" | 900 m || 
|-id=938 bgcolor=#FA8072
| 521938 ||  || — || August 8, 2004 || Socorro || LINEAR ||  || align=right data-sort-value="0.78" | 780 m || 
|-id=939 bgcolor=#E9E9E9
| 521939 ||  || — || June 17, 2006 || Kitt Peak || Spacewatch ||  || align=right | 1.1 km || 
|-id=940 bgcolor=#d6d6d6
| 521940 ||  || — || January 30, 2012 || Haleakala || Pan-STARRS ||  || align=right | 3.1 km || 
|-id=941 bgcolor=#d6d6d6
| 521941 ||  || — || May 31, 2014 || Haleakala || Pan-STARRS ||  || align=right | 3.0 km || 
|-id=942 bgcolor=#fefefe
| 521942 ||  || — || August 15, 2004 || Siding Spring || SSS ||  || align=right data-sort-value="0.90" | 900 m || 
|-id=943 bgcolor=#d6d6d6
| 521943 ||  || — || December 5, 2010 || Mount Lemmon || Mount Lemmon Survey ||  || align=right | 2.9 km || 
|-id=944 bgcolor=#E9E9E9
| 521944 ||  || — || June 4, 2014 || Haleakala || Pan-STARRS ||  || align=right | 1.2 km || 
|-id=945 bgcolor=#fefefe
| 521945 ||  || — || August 22, 2011 || La Sagra || OAM Obs. ||  || align=right data-sort-value="0.98" | 980 m || 
|-id=946 bgcolor=#d6d6d6
| 521946 ||  || — || November 5, 2010 || Kitt Peak || Spacewatch ||  || align=right | 3.3 km || 
|-id=947 bgcolor=#E9E9E9
| 521947 ||  || — || May 8, 2005 || Kitt Peak || Spacewatch || EUN || align=right | 1.4 km || 
|-id=948 bgcolor=#d6d6d6
| 521948 ||  || — || April 29, 2008 || Kitt Peak || Spacewatch ||  || align=right | 3.3 km || 
|-id=949 bgcolor=#E9E9E9
| 521949 ||  || — || December 4, 2007 || Kitt Peak || Spacewatch ||  || align=right | 1.8 km || 
|-id=950 bgcolor=#E9E9E9
| 521950 ||  || — || November 7, 2007 || Catalina || CSS ||  || align=right | 1.5 km || 
|-id=951 bgcolor=#E9E9E9
| 521951 ||  || — || November 18, 2011 || Kitt Peak || Spacewatch ||  || align=right | 1.2 km || 
|-id=952 bgcolor=#d6d6d6
| 521952 ||  || — || June 3, 2014 || Haleakala || Pan-STARRS ||  || align=right | 2.5 km || 
|-id=953 bgcolor=#d6d6d6
| 521953 ||  || — || October 10, 2015 || Haleakala || Pan-STARRS ||  || align=right | 2.8 km || 
|-id=954 bgcolor=#E9E9E9
| 521954 ||  || — || April 30, 2014 || Haleakala || Pan-STARRS || EUN || align=right data-sort-value="0.97" | 970 m || 
|-id=955 bgcolor=#E9E9E9
| 521955 ||  || — || October 21, 2015 || Haleakala || Pan-STARRS || EUN || align=right | 1.0 km || 
|-id=956 bgcolor=#d6d6d6
| 521956 ||  || — || April 24, 2007 || Mount Lemmon || Mount Lemmon Survey ||  || align=right | 2.7 km || 
|-id=957 bgcolor=#d6d6d6
| 521957 ||  || — || November 13, 2015 || Kitt Peak || Spacewatch ||  || align=right | 2.4 km || 
|-id=958 bgcolor=#E9E9E9
| 521958 ||  || — || September 14, 2006 || Catalina || CSS ||  || align=right | 1.6 km || 
|-id=959 bgcolor=#d6d6d6
| 521959 ||  || — || December 9, 2010 || Kitt Peak || Spacewatch ||  || align=right | 3.6 km || 
|-id=960 bgcolor=#d6d6d6
| 521960 ||  || — || February 22, 2012 || Siding Spring || SSS ||  || align=right | 3.8 km || 
|-id=961 bgcolor=#E9E9E9
| 521961 ||  || — || June 13, 2005 || Kitt Peak || Spacewatch ||  || align=right | 2.2 km || 
|-id=962 bgcolor=#d6d6d6
| 521962 ||  || — || January 6, 2006 || Kitt Peak || Spacewatch ||  || align=right | 2.2 km || 
|-id=963 bgcolor=#d6d6d6
| 521963 ||  || — || October 14, 2010 || Mount Lemmon || Mount Lemmon Survey ||  || align=right | 2.9 km || 
|-id=964 bgcolor=#d6d6d6
| 521964 ||  || — || October 15, 2004 || Mount Lemmon || Mount Lemmon Survey ||  || align=right | 4.1 km || 
|-id=965 bgcolor=#d6d6d6
| 521965 ||  || — || January 30, 2011 || Haleakala || Pan-STARRS ||  || align=right | 2.7 km || 
|-id=966 bgcolor=#d6d6d6
| 521966 ||  || — || September 20, 2009 || Mount Lemmon || Mount Lemmon Survey ||  || align=right | 2.0 km || 
|-id=967 bgcolor=#d6d6d6
| 521967 ||  || — || March 22, 2012 || Catalina || CSS ||  || align=right | 3.5 km || 
|-id=968 bgcolor=#d6d6d6
| 521968 ||  || — || July 28, 2014 || Haleakala || Pan-STARRS ||  || align=right | 2.0 km || 
|-id=969 bgcolor=#E9E9E9
| 521969 ||  || — || March 11, 2008 || Kitt Peak || Spacewatch ||  || align=right | 1.6 km || 
|-id=970 bgcolor=#E9E9E9
| 521970 ||  || — || October 10, 2010 || Mount Lemmon || Mount Lemmon Survey ||  || align=right | 1.9 km || 
|-id=971 bgcolor=#d6d6d6
| 521971 ||  || — || March 13, 2007 || Mount Lemmon || Mount Lemmon Survey ||  || align=right | 2.4 km || 
|-id=972 bgcolor=#d6d6d6
| 521972 ||  || — || November 8, 2015 || Mount Lemmon || Mount Lemmon Survey ||  || align=right | 2.9 km || 
|-id=973 bgcolor=#d6d6d6
| 521973 ||  || — || September 24, 2009 || Kitt Peak || Spacewatch ||  || align=right | 2.6 km || 
|-id=974 bgcolor=#d6d6d6
| 521974 ||  || — || July 4, 2014 || Haleakala || Pan-STARRS ||  || align=right | 2.9 km || 
|-id=975 bgcolor=#E9E9E9
| 521975 ||  || — || May 3, 2005 || Kitt Peak || Spacewatch ||  || align=right | 1.9 km || 
|-id=976 bgcolor=#fefefe
| 521976 ||  || — || November 23, 2008 || Kitt Peak || Spacewatch ||  || align=right data-sort-value="0.76" | 760 m || 
|-id=977 bgcolor=#E9E9E9
| 521977 ||  || — || September 30, 2006 || Mount Lemmon || Mount Lemmon Survey ||  || align=right | 1.2 km || 
|-id=978 bgcolor=#d6d6d6
| 521978 ||  || — || May 8, 2013 || Haleakala || Pan-STARRS ||  || align=right | 2.7 km || 
|-id=979 bgcolor=#d6d6d6
| 521979 ||  || — || February 27, 2012 || Haleakala || Pan-STARRS ||  || align=right | 2.5 km || 
|-id=980 bgcolor=#E9E9E9
| 521980 ||  || — || January 2, 2012 || Mount Lemmon || Mount Lemmon Survey ||  || align=right | 2.2 km || 
|-id=981 bgcolor=#d6d6d6
| 521981 ||  || — || June 18, 2013 || Haleakala || Pan-STARRS ||  || align=right | 3.3 km || 
|-id=982 bgcolor=#d6d6d6
| 521982 ||  || — || December 9, 2010 || Kitt Peak || Spacewatch ||  || align=right | 3.6 km || 
|-id=983 bgcolor=#E9E9E9
| 521983 ||  || — || April 11, 2003 || Kitt Peak || Spacewatch ||  || align=right | 1.7 km || 
|-id=984 bgcolor=#E9E9E9
| 521984 ||  || — || October 30, 2010 || Mount Lemmon || Mount Lemmon Survey ||  || align=right | 1.9 km || 
|-id=985 bgcolor=#E9E9E9
| 521985 ||  || — || December 16, 2007 || Kitt Peak || Spacewatch ||  || align=right | 2.3 km || 
|-id=986 bgcolor=#E9E9E9
| 521986 ||  || — || November 25, 2011 || Haleakala || Pan-STARRS ||  || align=right data-sort-value="0.96" | 960 m || 
|-id=987 bgcolor=#d6d6d6
| 521987 ||  || — || August 20, 2014 || Haleakala || Pan-STARRS ||  || align=right | 2.9 km || 
|-id=988 bgcolor=#E9E9E9
| 521988 ||  || — || April 30, 2005 || Kitt Peak || Spacewatch ||  || align=right | 1.6 km || 
|-id=989 bgcolor=#d6d6d6
| 521989 ||  || — || June 8, 2013 || Mount Lemmon || Mount Lemmon Survey ||  || align=right | 2.7 km || 
|-id=990 bgcolor=#d6d6d6
| 521990 ||  || — || January 23, 2011 || Mount Lemmon || Mount Lemmon Survey ||  || align=right | 2.3 km || 
|-id=991 bgcolor=#E9E9E9
| 521991 ||  || — || December 27, 2006 || Mount Lemmon || Mount Lemmon Survey ||  || align=right | 1.6 km || 
|-id=992 bgcolor=#E9E9E9
| 521992 ||  || — || February 25, 2012 || Catalina || CSS ||  || align=right | 1.5 km || 
|-id=993 bgcolor=#fefefe
| 521993 ||  || — || August 31, 2011 || Haleakala || Pan-STARRS ||  || align=right data-sort-value="0.70" | 700 m || 
|-id=994 bgcolor=#E9E9E9
| 521994 ||  || — || May 4, 2005 || Kitt Peak || Spacewatch ||  || align=right | 1.6 km || 
|-id=995 bgcolor=#E9E9E9
| 521995 ||  || — || March 31, 2008 || Kitt Peak || Spacewatch ||  || align=right | 1.7 km || 
|-id=996 bgcolor=#d6d6d6
| 521996 ||  || — || September 9, 2015 || Haleakala || Pan-STARRS ||  || align=right | 2.6 km || 
|-id=997 bgcolor=#E9E9E9
| 521997 ||  || — || July 12, 2005 || Mount Lemmon || Mount Lemmon Survey ||  || align=right | 2.1 km || 
|-id=998 bgcolor=#d6d6d6
| 521998 ||  || — || November 6, 2010 || Mount Lemmon || Mount Lemmon Survey ||  || align=right | 2.6 km || 
|-id=999 bgcolor=#d6d6d6
| 521999 ||  || — || January 4, 2011 || Mount Lemmon || Mount Lemmon Survey ||  || align=right | 2.5 km || 
|-id=000 bgcolor=#d6d6d6
| 522000 ||  || — || December 6, 2010 || Mount Lemmon || Mount Lemmon Survey ||  || align=right | 2.8 km || 
|}

References

External links 
 Discovery Circumstances: Numbered Minor Planets (520001)–(525000) (IAU Minor Planet Center)

0521